= Motion graphics =

Digital footage or animation which create the illusion of motion or rotation

Animation in and about motion graphics.

Motion graphics (sometimes mograph) are pieces of animation or digital footage that create the illusion of motion or rotation, and are usually combined with audio for use in multimedia projects. Motion graphics are usually displayed via electronic media technology, but may also be displayed via manual powered technology (e.g. thaumatrope, phenakistoscope, stroboscope, zoetrope, praxinoscope, flip book). The term distinguishes static graphics from those with a transforming appearance over time, without over-specifying the form. While any form of experimental or abstract animation can be called motion graphics, the term typically more explicitly refers to the commercial application of animation and effects to video, film, TV, and interactive applications.

== History of the term ==
Motion graphic clip about alebrijes created by the Museo de Arte Popular in Mexico City.

Since there is no universally accepted definition of motion graphics, the official beginning of the art form is disputed. There have been presentations that could be classified as motion graphics as early as the 19th century. Michael Betancourt wrote the first in-depth historical survey of the field, arguing for its foundations in visual music and the historical abstract films of the 1920s by Walther Ruttmann, Hans Richter, Viking Eggeling and Oskar Fischinger.

The history of motion graphics is closely related to the history of computer graphics, as the new developments of computer-generated graphics led to wider use of motion design not based on optical film animation. The term motion graphics originated with digital video editing in computing, perhaps to keep pace with newer technology. Graphics for television were originally referred to as Broadcast Design.

=== 1887-1941 ===
Walter Ruttmann was a German cinematographer and film director who worked mainly in experimental film. The films were experiments in new forms of film expression and featured shapes of different colors flowing back and forth and in and out of the lens. He started his film career in the early 1920s, starting with abstract films Lichtspiel: Opus I (1921), the first publicly screened abstract film, and Opus II (1923.) The animations were painted with oil on glass plates, so the wet paint could be wiped away and modified easily.

=== 1917-1995 ===
John Whitney was of the first users of the term "motion graphics" and founded a company called Motion Graphics Inc. in 1960. One of his most famous works was the animated title sequence from Alfred Hitchcock’s film “Vertigo” in 1958, collaborating with Saul Bass, which featured swirling graphics growing from small to large.

=== 1920-1996 ===
Saul Bass was a major pioneer in the development of feature film title sequences. His work included title sequences for popular films such as The Man with the Golden Arm (1955), Vertigo (1958), Anatomy of a Murder (1959), North by Northwest (1959), Psycho (1960), and Advise & Consent (1962). His designs were simple, but effectively communicated the mood of the film.

=== 1933-2003 ===
Stan Brakhage was one of the most important figures in 20th-century experimental film. He explored a variety of formats, creating a large, diverse body of work. His influence in the credits of the film Seven (1995), designed by Kyle Cooper, with the scratched emulsion, rapid cutaways, and bursts of light in his style.

== Computer-generated motion graphics ==
Computer-generated animations "are more controllable than other, more physically based processes, like constructing miniatures for effects shots, or hiring extras for crowd scenes, because it allows the creation for images that would not be feasible using any other technology."

Before computers were widely available, motion graphics were costly and time-consuming, limiting their use to high-budget filmmaking and television production. Computers began to be used as early as the late 1960s as super computers were capable of rendering crude graphics. John Whitney and Charles Csuri can be considered early pioneers of computer aided animation.

Adobe After Effects

In the late 1980s to mid-1990s, expensive proprietary graphics systems such as those from British-based Quantel were quite commonplace in many television stations. Quantel workstations such as the Hal, Henry, Harry, Mirage, and Paintbox were the broadcast graphics standard of the time. Many other real-time graphics systems were used such as Ampex ADO, Abekas A51 and Grass Valley Group Kaleidoscope for live digital video effects. Early proprietary 3D computer systems were also developed specifically for broadcast design such as the Bosch FGS-4000 which was used in the music video for Dire Straits' Money for Nothing. The advent of more powerful desktop computers running Photoshop in the mid-90s drastically lowered the costs for producing digital graphics. With the reduced cost of producing motion graphics on a computer, the discipline has seen more widespread use. With the availability of desktop programs such as Adobe After Effects, Adobe Premiere Pro and Apple Motion, motion graphics have become increasingly accessible. Modern character generators (CG) from Vizrt and Ross Video, incorporate motion graphics.

Motion graphics continued to evolve as an art form with the incorporation of sweeping camera paths and 3D elements. Maxon's Cinema 4D, plugins such as MoGraph and Adobe After Effects. Despite their relative complexity, Autodesk's Maya and 3D Studio Max are widely used for the animation and design of motion graphics, as is Maya and 3D Studio which uses a node-based particle system generator similar to Cinema 4D's Thinking Particles plugin. There are also some other packages in Open Source panorama, which are gaining more features and adepts in order to use in a motion graphics workflow, while Blender integrates several of the functions of its commercial counterparts.

Many motion graphics animators learn several 3D graphics packages for use according to each program's strengths. Although many trends in motion graphics tend to be based on a specific software's capabilities, the software is only a tool the broadcast designer uses while bringing the vision to life.

Leaning heavily from techniques such as the collage or the pastiche, motion graphics have begun to integrate many traditional animation techniques as well, including stop-motion animation, frame by frame animation, or a combination of both.

== Motion design and digital compositing software packages ==
Motion design applications include Adobe After Effects, Blackmagic Fusion, Nuke, Apple Motion, Max/MSP, various VJ programs, Moho, Adobe Animate, Natron. 3D programs used in motion graphics include Adobe Substance, Maxon Cinema 4D and Blender. Motion graphics plug-ins include Video Copilot's products, Red Giant Software and The Foundry Visionmongers.

== Methods of animation ==
Elements of a motion graphics project can be animated by various means, depending on the capabilities of the software. These elements may be in the form of art, text, photos, and video clips, to name a few. The most popular form of animation is keyframing, in which properties of an object can be specified at certain points in time by setting a series of keyframes so that the properties of the object can be automatically altered (or tweened) in the frames between keyframes. Another method involves a behavior system such as is found in Apple Motion that controls these changes by simulating natural forces without requiring the more rigid but precise keyframing method. Yet another method involves the use of formulas or scripts, such as the expressions function in Adobe After Effects or the creation of ActionScripts within Adobe Flash.

Computers are capable of calculating and randomizing changes in imagery to create the illusion of motion and transformation. Computer animations can use less information space (computer memory) by automatically tweening, a process of rendering the key changes of an image at a specified or calculated time. These key poses or frames are commonly referred to as keyframes or low CP. Adobe Flash uses computer animation tweening as well as frame-by-frame animation and video.

== Notable filmmakers who have informed the motion graphics industry ==
- Saul Bass
- John Whitney
- Maurice Binder
- Stan Brakhage
- Robert Abel
- Kyle Cooper
- Pablo Ferro
- Oskar Fischinger
- Martin Lambie-Nairn
- Len Lye
- Norman McLaren

== Studios ==
Early ground breaking motion design studios include:

- Charlex
- Aerodrome
- Broadway Video
- Rushes Postproduction
- Sogitech
- Robert Abel and Associates
- Marks & Marks
- Pacific Data Images
- Pittard Sullivan
- Japan Computer Graphics Lab
- Cranston/Csuri Productions

== See also ==
- Audiovisual art
- Live event support
- Scanimate
- Video art
- Video synthesizer
- Motion graphic design
- Music visualization
- User Experience Design
- After Effects
