= Alembic (computer graphics) =

File format

- Filename extension: .abc
- Developed by: Sony Pictures Imageworks (Sony Pictures Entertainment); Industrial Light & Magic (Lucasfilm)
- Initial release: August 9, 2011
- Latest release: 1.8.4; November 11, 2022; 3 years ago
- Type of format: Exchange format for computer graphics
- Open format?: Yes
- Website: www.alembic.io

Alembic is an interchangeable computer graphics file format developed by Sony Pictures Imageworks and Industrial Light & Magic. It was announced at SIGGRAPH 2011, and has been widely adopted across the industry by visual effects and animation professionals.

Its primary focus is the efficient interchange of animated geometry (models) between different groups working on the same shots or same assets, possibly using different applications. Often different departments in the same company or different studios are working on the same projects. Alembic supports the common geometric representations used in the industry, including polygon meshes, subdivision surface, parametric curves, NURBS patches and particles. Alembic also has support for transform hierarchies and cameras. With the latest version comes initial support for materials and lights as well. Alembic specifically is not focused on storing the complex dependency graphs of procedural tools but instead stores the "baked" results by sampling the model data at different points along an animated scene's timeline.

== Tools which support Alembic ==
=== Tools with native support ===
Application	As of version	Vendor
Flame	2016	Autodesk
Adobe Substance		Adobe Inc
Maya	2012	Autodesk
3ds Max	2016	Autodesk
KATANA	1.1	The Foundry
Houdini	11.1	Side Effects Software
iClone	6.5	Reallusion Inc.
RenderMan	?	Pixar
Arnold	?	Solid Angle
MARI	10.2v1	The Foundry
MODO	10.2v1	The Foundry
NUKE	7.0	The Foundry
Cinema 4D	R14	Maxon
V-Ray	2012	Chaos Group
Guerilla Render	0.15.2	Mercenaries Engineering
RealFlow	2013	Next Limit
Maxwell Render	3	Next Limit
Clarisse iFX	2012	Isotropix
LightWave 3D	11.6	NewTek
Keyshot Pro	4	Luxion
Octane Render	1.5	Otoy
Blender	2.78	Blender Foundation
Fusion	7.0	Blackmagic Design
Unreal Engine	4.13	Epic Games
Unity Engine	2018.1	Unity Technologies
EmberGen	0.7.5	JangaFX
Marvelous Designer	?	CLO Virtual Fashion

=== Plugins ===
Plugin	Applications supported	Vendor
Crate Suite	3DS Max, Maya, Softimage, Arnold	Exocortex
AtomKraft	Nuke, After Effects	Jupiter Jazz
Ortholab	Mudbox	Ortholab
DF Plugin	3DS Max	Digital Frontier
Alembic Exporter	Daz Studio	Daz 3D
