= OpenFX (API) =

Open standard for 2D visual effects or compositing plug-ins

OpenFX (OFX), also known as the OFX Image Effect Plug-in API, is an open standard for 2D visual effects or compositing plug-ins. It allows plug-ins written to the standard to work on any application that supports the standard. The OpenFX standard is owned by The Open Effects Association, and it is released under a 'BSD' open source license. OpenFX was originally designed by Bruno Nicoletti at The Foundry Visionmongers.

Plug-ins are written as dynamic shared objects, and the API specifies a few entry points that must be implemented by the plug-in.

The OpenFX host exposes sets of entry points to the plug-in, called suites. The Property Suite is used to manage attribute-value pairs attached to objects defined by all other suites of the API, the Image Effect Suite is used to fetch film frames from the inputs or the output of the effect, and there are other suites to display informative messages or ask questions to the user, handle multithreading, use OpenGL for processing, etc.

Each plugin is described by a list of parameters and supported inputs and output. The host may execute various actions, for example to signal that a parameter value has changed or that a portion of a film frame has to be rendered.

Optionally, the plug-in may also display graphical information over the current frame using OpenGL, and propose interactions using mouse and keyboard (this is called interacts in the OFX specification).

An OpenFX host is an application capable of loading and executing OpenFX plugins.

== History ==
Current version is 1.5 as of December 2024.

OpenFX was first announced on Feb 10, 2004 The Foundry Visionmongers.

The OpenFX specification was written so that a plugin supporting the latest version of the API may be implemented to be compatible with a host implementing an earlier version.

1. OpenFX 1.0 was released in 2006.
2. OpenFX 1.1 was released in 2007.
3. OpenFX 1.2 was released in 2010.
4. OpenFX 1.3 was released in 2012.
5. OpenFX 1.4 was released in 2015.
6. OpenFX 1.5 was released in 2024.

== Hosts ==
=== Free and open source hosts ===
- ButtleOFX (for Linux, open source, LGPL license, alpha status, unmaintained)
- Kaliscope (scanner controller/batch conversion tool based on OpenFX host and plugins, open source, GPL 3 license)
- Natron for macOS, Linux, FreeBSD and Windows (open source, GPL license)
- Ramen compositor (CDDL 1.0 license, never officially released, but source code is available)
- ShuttleOFX (online OpenFX platform, open source, LGPL license)
- TuttleOFX (command-line OpenFX host and plugins, open source, LGPL license)

=== Commercial hosts ===
- Baselight (from version 2.2) by FilmLight
- Catalyst Edit by Sony Creative Software
- DaVinci Resolve (from version 10), by Blackmagic Design
- DustBuster+ (from version 4.5), by HS-ART
- DVS Clipster by DVS
- EDIUS Pro (from version 8.1, by OFX-bridge plugin from NewBlueFX), by Grass Valley
- Fusion (from version 4.04), by Blackmagic Design (formerly by eyeon)
- HitFilm (from version 3 Pro) by FXhome
- Mistika (from version 6.5.35) and Mamba FX by SGO
- Motion Studio by IDT Vision
- Nucoda Film Master (from version 2011.2.058) by Digital Vision
- Nuke (from version 4.5), by Foundry
- Piranha by Interactivefx
- Quantel Rio by SAM
- SCRATCH (from version 6.1), by Assimilate
- Titler Pro 4 by NewBlueFX
- Toon Boom Harmony
- Vegas Pro (from version 10), by Magix Software GmbH
- Vegas Movie Studio (Platinum edition and above), by Magix Software GmbH

Discontinued:

- Autodesk Toxik (from version 2009) (included with Maya)
- Avid DS (from version 10.3)
- Bones by Thomson/Technicolor
- MATRIX Compositing by Chrome Imaging
- Shake by Apple

== OpenFX plug-ins ==
=== Free and open source plugins ===
- The official OpenFX SDK (BSD license) contain sample plugins, programmed using the standard C API, or a C++ wrapper.
- openfx-arena is a set of visual effects plugins, mainly based on ImageMagick.
- openfx-io is a set of plugins for reading or writing image and video files (using OpenImageIO and FFmpeg), and for color management (using OpenColorIO).
- openfx-misc is a collection of essential plugins, which provide many basic compositing tools, such as filters, geometric transforms, and color transforms. Commercial OpenFX hosts usually provide their own versions of these plugins.
- TuttleOFX provides many plug-ins, especially for color grading, usable in most OpenFX hosts.
- INK green/blue screen keyer and ChannelMath by casanico.com
- TalentTracker by Mut1ny.com

=== Commercial plug-ins ===
- Beauty Box Video by digital anarchy
- Color Symmetry
- Composite Suite Pro, Film Stocks, Rays, reFine, zMatte, Tiffen DFX by Digital Film Tools
- DE:Flicker, DE:Noise, RE:Match, Twixtor and ReelSmart Motion Blur by RE:Vision Effects
- Dehancer OFX plugin for DaVinci Resolve, Baselight, Assimilate SCRATCH and Vegas Pro by Dehancer
- Film Convert for OFX by Rubber Monkey Software
- Genifect by Dual Heights Software
- HitFilm Ignite by FXhome
- HDR Enhanced by AlphaPlugins
- Lenscare and Flair by frischluft
- RealPerception by Motiva
- Neat Video by ABSoft
- NewBlueFX plugins (including Titler Pro 3)
- Primatte by Photron/Imagica
- Red Giant Universe and Magic Bullet (in version 12.1, Looks, Film, Cosmo and Mojo are OpenFX plugins) by Red Giant Software
- Sapphire Visual Effects OFX and Monsters GT VFX Plugins OFX by GenArts
- InviziGrain by InviziPro

== Extensions ==
OpenFX' suite-based design enables one to easily introduce new sets of entry points, in order to cover other applications while still relying on the same core dynamic plug-in mechanism. A notable example is OpenMfx, an API based on OpenFX but meant to define procedural effects on 3D meshes rather than 2D images. A host that supports the Image Effects API does not necessarily support the Mesh Effect API, and vice versa, but both support the same core plug-in mechanism and basic suites like the Property Suite or the Parameter Suite. OpenMfx is an initiative independent from The Open Effects Association, led by Élie Michel since 2019.

== Documentation ==
- The OFX Image Effects API is the official reference.
- The OFX Programming Guide for Image Effects by Bruno Nicoletti.
- OpenFX plugin programming guide, based on the C++ Support library.
- OpenMfx documentation, an OFX Mesh Effects API, including the API reference as well as a C++ Support library and some tutorials.
