= DaVinci Resolve =

Video editing application by Blackmagic Design

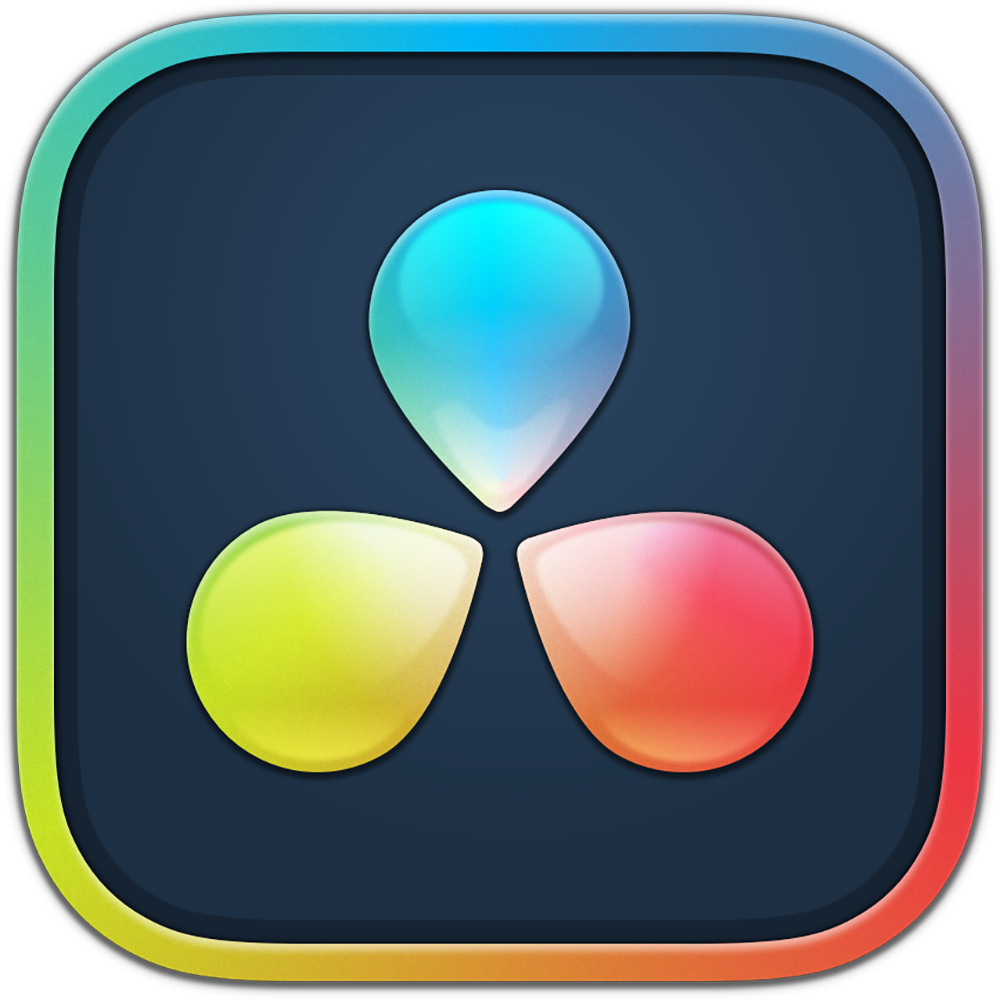
- Logo since 2023

- DaVinci Resolve version 21
- Developers: Blackmagic Design (2009–present) da Vinci Systems (2004–2009)
- Release: 2004; 22 years ago
- Stable release: 21.1 / 8 September 2026
- Operating system: macOS; Windows; Linux; iPadOS
- Available in: 10 languages
- List of languages: English; Spanish; Japanese; Simplified Chinese; French; Portuguese; Russian; Korean; Thai; Vietnamese
- Type: Video editing software; color grading software
- License: Proprietary commercial software, freeware and freemium
- Website: blackmagicdesign.com/products/davinciresolve

DaVinci Resolve is a proprietary application for non-linear video editing, color correction, color grading, visual effects, and audio post-production. It is developed by the Australian company Blackmagic Design for macOS, Windows, iPadOS and Linux. The software was originally created by the American company da Vinci Systems and released as da Vinci Resolve. In 2009, da Vinci Systems was acquired by Blackmagic Design, which has since continued the software's development.

DaVinci Resolve is available in two editions: a free version, and a paid version known as DaVinci Resolve Studio. The Studio edition includes support for resolutions beyond 4K (up to 32K) and frame rates up to 120 frames per second, as well as 10-bit video processing, multiple GPU acceleration, stereoscopic 3D, HDR grading, collaborative workflows, additional plug-ins and AI-driven features.

The software is structured around task-specific workspaces called "pages", each designed for a distinct stage of the post-production workflow. The Cut and Edit pages support video editing; the Fusion page provides tools for visual effects and motion graphics; the Color page focuses on color grading; and the Fairlight page is used for audio editing and mixing. Media management and export are handled through the Media and Deliver pages, respectively. In other software suites, these functions are typically distributed across separate applications. In some cases—such as Fusion and Fairlight—they were previously standalone programs that were later integrated.

Blackmagic Design, primarily a hardware manufacturer, markets DaVinci Resolve as part of a broader ecosystem of peripherals. The company offers integration with proprietary hardware such as editing keyboards, color grading panels, and audio consoles. The Studio edition of the software is frequently bundled at no additional cost with purchases of Blackmagic Design cameras.

== Development ==
=== Original da Vinci Systems development (2003–2009) ===
The initial versions of DaVinci Resolve (known then as da Vinci Resolve) were resolution-independent software tools developed by da Vinci Systems (based in Coral Springs, Florida), who had previously produced other color correction systems such as da Vinci Classic (1985), da Vinci Renaissance (1990), and da Vinci 2K (1998). The system was first announced in 2003 and released in 2004. It began with three possible configurations: the Resolve DI digital intermediate color correction tool, the Resolve FX visual effects tool, and the Resolve RT 2K resolution processing tool. These initial versions were integrated exclusively into dedicated hardware controllers.

The systems leveraged parallel processing in an InfiniBand topology to support performance during color grading. This was initially implemented using proprietary hardware cards; however, the 4K resolution Resolve R series (such as the R-100, introduced in 2008, and the stereoscopic 3D R-360-3D, introduced in 2009) replaced this proprietary hardware with CUDA-based Nvidia GPUs.

In 2009, Australian video processing and distribution technology company Blackmagic Design bought da Vinci Systems, retaining and expanding the engineering team for Resolve but eliminating support-based contracts for the tool. In October 2009, Blackmagic Design CEO Grant Petty speculated in an interview that the price of Resolve could likely be reduced to below $100,000.

=== Blackmagic Design versions (2010–present) ===
At NAB 2010 in Las Vegas, in April 2010, Blackmagic Design announced three new pricing models for Resolve, with a new software-only macOS version retailing for $995, the macOS version with the Advanced Control Surface (previously branded as Impresario by da Vinci Systems) retailing for $29,995, and licenses for the Linux version (supporting multiple-GPUs for increased performance) retailing at $19,995 (with the most advanced configuration available retailing for under $150,000). Before this change, the pre-built versions of Resolve were the only available options, selling for between $200,000 and $800,000, which was common industry practice at the time.

In September 2010, version 7 (restyled as DaVinci Resolve) was the first to be released by Blackmagic Design under the new pricing model, and the first release for macOS. It included a redesigned user interface, Apple ProRes support, and support for the RED Rocket digital video decoder boards manufactured by Red Digital Cinema.

The pricing model changes continued in June 2011 with the release of version 8: As part of this new version, Blackmagic Design announced a free, reduced-functionality edition of the software (known as DaVinci Resolve 8 Lite), alongside the continuing commercial options. Version 8 also introduced OpenCL acceleration support and XML integration with non-linear editor (NLE) applications. Subsequently, version 8.2 (December 2011) further expanded the software's scope (which was previously available only for macOS and Linux) with the first Windows release, beginning with a public beta.

Version 9 (2012) included redesigned user interface elements, added metadata editing options, and expanded the range of supported cameras and file types. The following year, version 10 was released, increasing the amount of information imported from XML, AAF and EDL files, and adding OpenFX plug-in, JPEG 2000 and AVI support. Version 10 was also the first to include basic video editing features alongside the color correction functionality, such as the trimming of clips.

Released in August 2014, version 11 added audio mixing, media organization features, and further video editing features, enabling the software to function as a standalone non-linear editor (NLE) for the first time, in addition to integrating with other NLEs.

Subsequently, version 12 (announced at NAB 2015) added a new audio engine (supporting VST/AU plug-ins), and version 14 (2017) added an integrated version of audio editing software previously developed by Fairlight (following Blackmagic Design's acquisition of the company during the same year).

The first version of Resolve for standard editions of Linux (version 12.5.5) was made available in 2017. It was also the first version in which a free Resolve version for Linux became available. Previous versions required a custom build of Linux, use of the DaVinci Resolve Advanced hardware control panel, and a license dongle.

Released in 2018, version 15 added an integrated version of the Fusion compositing and visual effects application, which was first developed in 1987 and was acquired by Blackmagic Design in 2014.

Blackmagic Design officially announced DaVinci Resolve version 16 at NAB 2019, in April 2019. New features included a dedicated 'Cut' page (a streamlined alternative to the 'Edit' page), machine learning functionality (Studio edition only) to handle repetitive tasks (e.g. facial recognition to sort clips by person), 3D audio within Fairlight, and new collaboration features (including Frame.io integration). Version 16.0 was made available on August 8, 2019.

The first details for DaVinci Resolve version 17 were announced on November 9, 2020, including improved Fairlight audio and HDR color correction tools. Version 17.0 final was officially released on February 25, 2021. Version 17.1 was released on March 10, 2021, and was the first Mac release to run natively on Apple silicon. Version 17.2 was released on May 12, 2021, and added AV1 hardware decoding support. Version 17.4 was released on October 22, 2021. Version 17.4.6 added AV1 hardware encoding support.

DaVinci Resolve 18 was officially announced on April 18, 2022, with introduction of real-time collaborative video editing, using Blackmagic Cloud devices as host servers; it was officially released on July 21, 2022. DaVinci Resolve 18.1, released on November 11, 2022, added Nvidia NVENC AV1 hardware encoding support.

On October 20, 2022, Blackmagic Design announced that DaVinci Resolve was also coming to iPadOS for the first time, stated that DaVinci Resolve for iPad would take advantage of 12.9-inch screen of the iPad Pro, and would be "a true professional editor that’s focused on introducing new innovations in speed". Unlike the desktop application, the iPad application provides only editing and color-related functionalities, while maintaining compatibility with DaVinci Resolve 18 project files and real-time collaboration via Blackmagic Cloud. DaVinci Resolve for iPad was released as a free app on Apple's App Store in December 2022, with the option to upgrade to DaVinci Resolve Studio via a $95 in-app purchase.

The logo of DaVinci Resolve 19

DaVinci Resolve 19 was officially announced on April 12, 2024. It added new AI tools, over 100 feature upgrades such as IntelliTrack AI, Ultra NR noise reduction, ColorSlice six vector grading, film look creator FX, multi source editing, new multipoly rotoscoping tools, new Fairlight AI audio panning to video, ducker track FX and ambisonic surround sound plus new features in Blackmagic Cloud for large customers.

DaVinci Resolve 20 was announced on April 4, 2025 with over 100 new features and AI tools such as AI IntelliScript, AI Animated Subtitles, AI Multicam SmartSwitch and AI Audio Assistant, as well as keyframe editing, voice over palettes, multi layer compositing tools, new optical flow vector tools and major updates to Magic Mask and depth map. It was released on May 28, 2025.

== Functionality ==
The software includes modules for video editing, color correction, audio mixing/effects (including Fairlight), and visual effects (including Fusion). It can either be used as an intermediary between other NLE software and Digital Cinema Package (DCP) creation software, or as a standalone end-to-end video editing application.

For content delivery to services such as Netflix, Resolve provides functionality to create and validate IMF (Interoperable Master Format, standardized by SMPTE) packages, known as IMPs (which comprise multiple components, such as MXF content, a composition playlist (CPL), and XML package data), without the use of separate DCP software.

Compatible file formats include video formats such as AVI, MP4, QuickTime, DNxHD, XAVC, and AV1; data exchange formats such as XML, EDL, AAF, DCP, MXF, and CinemaDNG; audio formats such as AAC, AIFF, and WAVE; and image formats such as RAW, OpenEXR, TIFF, DPX, R3D, JPEG, and JPEG 2000.

Supported plug-in types include OpenFX, VST, and AU.

As of version 12.2 (December 2015), Resolve supports the hybrid log–gamma (HLG) standard for a high dynamic range, as well as OpenCL and Intel Quick Sync Video.

=== Studio edition ===
Unlike the free edition of the software, the commercial edition, DaVinci Resolve Studio, supports resolutions greater than ultra-high-definition (4K) (up to 32K) and frame-rates over 60 FPS (up to 120). It also includes support for multiple GPUs, additional OpenFX plug-ins such as Face Tracking and Lens Flare, stereoscopic grading, video noise reduction, motion blur, HDR color grading, and user collaboration tools.

It is also the only edition to include the machine learning functions introduced as part of Resolve version 16.

=== Fairlight integration ===
Since version 14 (2017), DaVinci Resolve has included an integrated version of the software developed by Fairlight (now owned by Blackmagic Design) designed for TV and film post-production, and live audio mixing. The Resolve-integrated software supports up to 1000 audio tracks, with a maximum of 6 inserts and 24 aux-sends per track. Other functionality includes 96-channel audio recording and 3D audio mixing for formats such as 5.1, 7.1 and 22.2. Integrated audio tools include compression/expansion, limiting, gating and parametric EQ.

Fairlight software has been used in the production of TV shows, advertisements, and feature films such as Logan and Murder on the Orient Express.

=== Fusion integration ===
Since version 15 (2018), DaVinci Resolve also includes an integrated version of the Fusion application for compositing and visual effects, also developed by Blackmagic Design. Fusion's core functionality is based on a modular, node-based interface, with each node forming one specific aspect of the effects being implemented. Nodes are particularly helpful for visualizing the connection each layer has within a Fusion Composition. The same interface style is used in the Resolve-integrated version. Fusion is often used as a primary choice in a majority of Motion Graphics/VFX work for large scale productions as well.

Prior to its integration with Resolve, the standalone Fusion version was used to create effects for over 1,000 feature films and TV shows, including The Martian, Kingsman: The Secret Service and The Hunger Games: Mockingjay Part 2.

=== Mac App Store versions ===
The free version of DaVinci Resolve and DaVinci Resolve Studio are available from the macOS App Store. However, some functionality, such as CUDA support is not available and VST or OpenFX plugins may have limited compatibility. This is due to restrictions imposed by Apple.

=== iPad version ===
In December 2022, DaVinci Resolve for iPad was released. It is supported on iPads with an Apple A12 Bionic chip or newer running iPadOS 16 or later.

== Related hardware ==
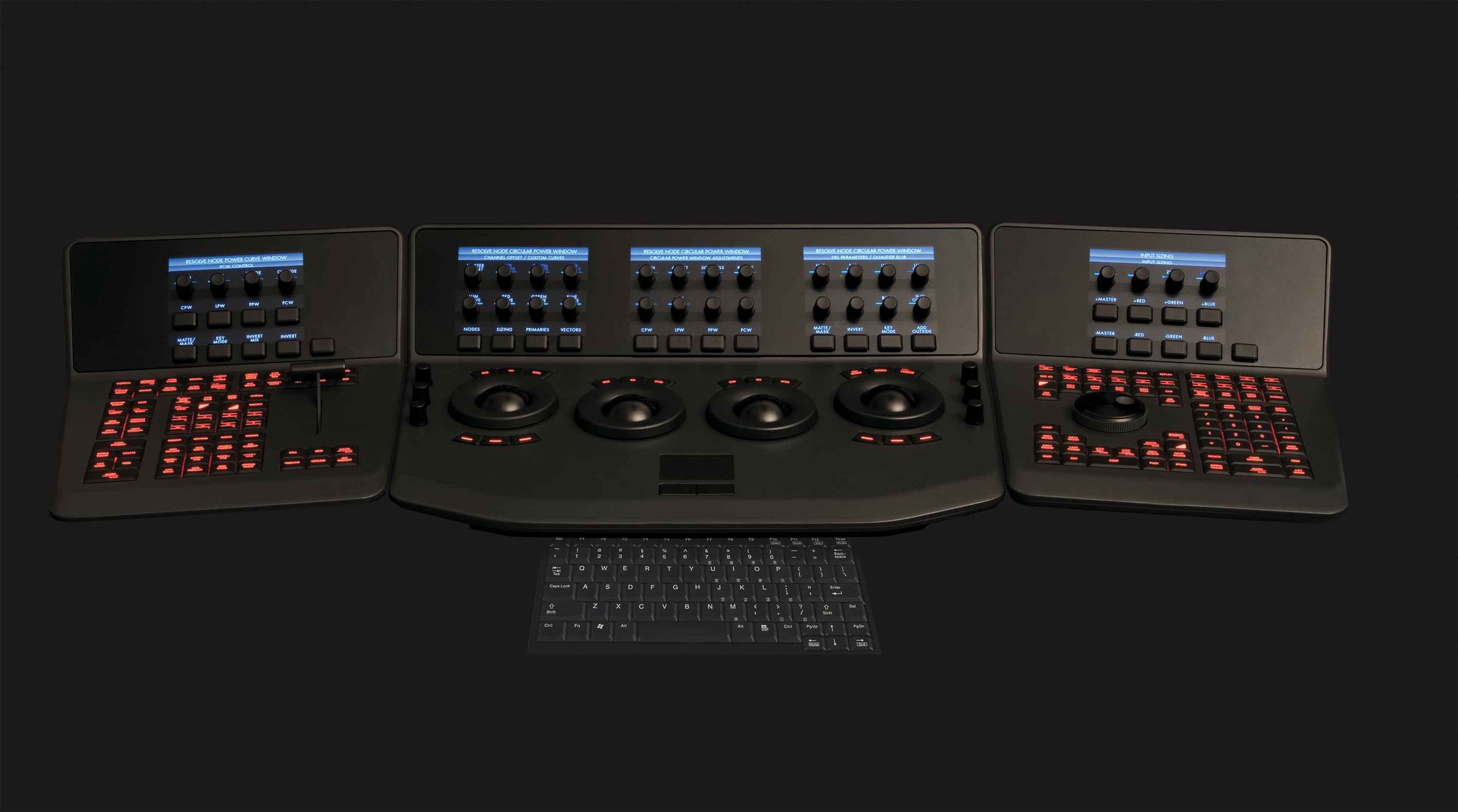
The DaVinci Resolve Advanced Panel (previously known as Impresario)

Since introducing software-only options for Resolve, Blackmagic Design have also released hardware control panels that integrate with the software and provide users with a tactile interface and access to additional shortcuts. They include the DaVinci Resolve Micro Panel, the DaVinci Resolve Mini Panel (both released in 2017), and the DaVinci Resolve Advanced Panel (previously known as Impresario when manufactured by da Vinci Systems).

In addition to the full control panels, Blackmagic Design also announced the Editor Keyboard for Resolve in April 2019. It includes a standard computer keyboard and specialized components (such as a transport control for altering timeline position) to support two-handed editing. Before the release of the Editor Keyboard, the DaVinci Resolve Speed Editor, which integrates the advanced functionalities of the relatively new Cut page, was introduced.

Resolve also integrates with other hardware produced by Blackmagic Design, such as their Cintel film scanner.

In July 2018, Blackmagic Design released an external, portable graphics processing unit, the eGPU, developed in association with Apple to leverage the Metal API for professional video and graphics (such as those used by DaVinci Resolve).

== Reception ==
Davinci Resolve only had 100 users in 2009; however, since being acquired by Blackmagic Design, the software had a user base of more than 2 million using the free version alone as of January 2019. This is a comparable user base to Apple's Final Cut Pro X, which also had 2 million users as of April 2017.

In 2011, DaVinci Resolve received a Red Dot award for highest rated 'Motion Picture Colour Grading System'. The software continues to play an industry-leading role in colour representation within Film.

Version 14 received an additional Red Dot award in 2017 for 'User Interface Design, Post-Production Software', and in the same year, the software's newly released control panels, the Micro Panel and Mini Panel, also received Red Dot awards for 'Motion Picture Colour Grading System'.

Version 14 also received a 2018 Good Design Australia Award, as did the DaVinci Resolve Mini Panel.

In 2018, the Hollywood Professional Association (HPA) named DaVinci Resolve (version 15) as a recipient of their 2018 Engineering Excellence Awards.

== Media produced using DaVinci Resolve ==
=== Film ===
DaVinci Resolve has been used for the color grading and/or editing of feature films such as Alien: Covenant, Avatar, Best of Enemies, Deadpool 2, Jason Bourne, Kingsman: The Golden Circle, La La Land, Love & Mercy, the Pirates of the Caribbean series, Prometheus, Anora, Robin Hood, Spectre, Star Wars: The Last Jedi, and X-Men: Apocalypse.

At the 2019 Academy Awards, DaVinci Resolve and Blackmagic Design were used to create five of the eight films nominated for Best Picture: Green Book (which won Best Picture), Bohemian Rhapsody (which won the most awards), The Favourite (which earned the most nominations), Roma (which also earned the most nominations), and Vice. Additionally, the two programs were used to create 13 of the films nominated for awards at the 2018 Academy Awards, nine at the 2017 Academy Awards, seven at the 2016 Academy Awards, four at the 2014 Academy Awards, and four at the 2010 Academy Awards (including two for Best Picture).

20 films nominated for awards at the 2015 Sundance Film Festival used DaVinci Resolve, followed by 35 in 2016, over 45 in 2017, over 55 in 2018, and over 35 in 2019. The programs have also been used on films at other festivals, including over 25 films at the 2018 Austin Film Festival, three at the 2014 Cannes Film Festival, 21 at the 2015 Cannes Film Festival, the 2019 Tribeca Film Festival, and the 2016 and 2017 South by Southwest festivals.

DaVinci Resolve has also been used in the restoration of classic films such as Les Misérables, Spartacus, Black Like Me, Jamaica Inn, and The Perfect Woman.

=== Television ===
DaVinci Resolve software has been used in television shows including 2 Broke Girls, American Horror Story, Arrow, Ash vs Evil Dead, The Big Bang Theory, Criminal Minds, Daredevil, The Flash, Gotham, How to Get Away with Murder, The Last Man on Earth, Lethal Weapon, The Man in the High Castle, The Mentalist, The Muppets, NCIS: Los Angeles, Orphan Black, Portlandia, Sons of Anarchy, Supernatural, The Walking Dead, What We Do in the Shadows, and Westworld.

The software has also been used in the creation of Emmy Award-winning shows such as Game of Thrones and Modern Family.

In the fall of 2018, over 55 television and streaming series relied on Blackmagic Design software and hardware such as DaVinci Resolve.

=== Other media ===
DaVinci Resolve has also been used during the creation of other media, such as music videos, advertisements, concert productions, and online media.

== See also ==
- Comparison of video editing software
- List of video editing software
