= OpenFX =

OpenFX may refer to:

- OpenFX (software) Open-source 3D modeling and animation software
- OpenFX (API) Open-source 2D image effects plugin API
