= Universal Scene Description =

3D standard developed by Pixar

USD
- Filename extension: .usd, .usda, .usdc, .usdz
- Developed by: Alliance for OpenUSD (AOUSD)
- Type of format: 3D computer graphics
- Website: www.openusd.org

Universal Scene Description (USD) is a framework for interchange of 3D computer graphics data. The framework focuses on collaboration, non-destructive editing, and enabling multiple views and opinions about graphics data. USD is used in many industries including visual effects, architecture, design, robotics, CAD, and rendering.

== History ==
It is developed by Pixar and was first published as open source software in 2016, under a modified Apache license. Pixar, Adobe, Apple, Autodesk, and Nvidia, together with the Joint Development Foundation (JDF) of the Linux Foundation, announced the Alliance for OpenUSD (AOUSD) on 1 August 2023 to "promote the standardization, development, evolution, and growth of Pixar's Universal Scene Description technology."

== File formats ==
File formats used by the specification include:

- .usd, which can be either ASCII or binary-encoded
- .usda, ASCII encoded
- .usdc, binary encoded
- .usdz, a package file which is a zero-compression, unencrypted zip archive, which may contain usd, usda, usdc, png, jpeg, m4a, mp3, and wav files.

== Support ==
- Adobe Substance 3D
- Apple's Reality Composer Pro supports .usdz files for its Reality Kit and visionOS ecosystem.
- Apple's SceneKit supports .usdz files for 3D model interchange.
- Autodesk 3ds Max supports USD as of version 2022. Includes Import from USD and Export to USD.
- Autodesk Fusion 360 supports USD export since April 2022.
- Autodesk Inventor supports USD as of version 2023.
- Autodesk Maya supports USD as of version 2022.
- Autodesk VRED Professional 2025 (.usd, .usda, .usdc, .udsz).
- Blender includes support for USD import and export as of Version 4.0.
- Cinema 4D includes support for USD for import and export.
- Davinci Resolve includes support for importing USD.
- Fusion includes support for importing USD.
- Houdini includes an implementation of USD, for purposes of format interchange and scene editing.
- MoonRay
- Nvidia has announced support for USD in Omniverse, a graphics collaboration platform.
- Rhinoceros 3D though support is currently limited to v8 WIP (work in progress) and is not yet supported on the current stable release.
- Unreal Engine supports (.usd, .usda, .usdc, .usdz) though the importer is in beta right now.
- Vectorworks 2023 Service Pack 3 onwards includes USD export and import.

== See also ==
- Alembic – interchangeable computer graphics file format
- glTF – Graphics Library Transmission Format
