= Sergey Ilyin-Kozlovsky =

- Born: Sergey Vladimirovich Ilyin-Kozlovsky; February 27, 1977 (age 49); Moscow, Moscow Oblast, RSFSR, USSR
- Other name: Сергей Владимирович Ильин-Козловский
- Citizenship: Russia
- Occupations: Director, producer, screenwriter, TV presenter
- Years active: 2000–present

Sergey Vladimirovich Ilyin-Kozlovsky (Russian: Сергей Владимирович Ильин-Козловский, born February 27, 1977, Moscow) is a Russian director, producer, screenwriter and TV presenter. Specializes in creating historical, popular science and educational projects.

== Biography ==
Born on February 27, 1977, in Moscow. In the early 2000s, he began developing popular science and educational television programs. The projects "New Wonders of the World" (2002) and "The Nature of Things" (2005) became the first popular science projects of Russian television, which used complex full-fledged graphic and scenario technologies.

In 2002, he became a co-author of the cycle "The Seekers" the first investigative historical project on Russian television. In 2017, he became the director of the television version of Philip Kirkorov's anniversary concert show "I'm in the Kremlin". Later, he acted as a director, screenwriter and producer of the opening and closing films of the 2018 FIFA World Cup in Russia. In 2019, he became the author of an anniversary project dedicated to the XXII Winter Olympic Games in Sochi "Hot, Winter, Yours".

Since the 2020s, his activities have focused on the production of multi-part documentary and staged television series using innovative technologies such as AI-art, CGI graphics, 3D graphics, digital compositing and others. At this time, he is completing work on the series "A short guide to how the world works", based on the book by the famous publicist and public figure, honorary founder of the Swiss Press Club Guy Matt, "Russia-the West. The Millennial War". The key theme of the series was Russophobia: its origins, causes (explicit and hidden), and goals.

In 2024–2025, a series was released on Channel One "Ordinary fascism 2", and in the same year, he created Russia's first holographic performance film "Jewish Life: History and Modernity" for permanent display in the museum interior of the Jewish Museum in Moscow. In November 2025, a film was released on Channel One "Portrait in the interior. On Nikita Mikhalkov's 80th birthday", which became the first Russian television project in which artificial intelligence fully operates in the frame in parallel with a live character.

== Filmography ==
- 2002–2007 — «Новые Чудеса Света»
- 2002–2015 — «Искатели»
- 2005 — «Природа вещей»
- 2014 — «Первый выстрел Первой мировой»
- 2015 — «Сказки Пушкина. Версия авангардиста»
- 2015 — «ВДНХ»
- 2015 — «Артек»
- 2017 — «Я Филиппа Киркорова»
- 2017 — «Я в Кремле»
- 2017 — Opening and closing films of the Confederations Cup
- 2018 — Opening and closing films of the FIFA World Cup
- 2018–2020 — «Краткое пособие по тому, как устроен мир»
- 2019 — «Жаркие. Зимние. Твои»
- 2020 — «Вселенная Стаса Намина»
- 2023 — «Век СССР»
- 2024 — «Товарищ СССР»
- 2024 — «Приключение улиц»
- 2024–2025 — «Обыкновенный фашизм 2».
- 2025 — «Еврейская жизнь: история и современность»
- 2025 — «Портрет в интерьере»
- 2026 — «Стругацкие. Сторона А и Сторона Б»
- 2027 – «Параллельная вселенная Стаса Намина»
- 2027 — «Краткое пособие по тому, как устроен мир — 2»
