= Imaginative Illusions =

Imaginative Illusions Sdn. Bhd.
- Company type: Private
- Founded: 1997; 29 years ago
- Headquarters: Johor Bahru, Johor, Malaysia
- Website: www.imaginative.com.my

Imaginative Illusions Sdn. Bhd. is a multimedia and software development company based in Johor Bahru, Johor, Malaysia. The company was founded in 1997, and specializes in developing games for the PC, software engineering, web hosting, and internet services. Imaginative Illusions Sdn. Bhd. is also a 3D Production studio which provides services in 3D Graphics and video development, animation, compositing, editing and special effects. The company has developed the shoot 'em up game for the PC titled "Vanguard Ace."
