= OFX =

OFX may refer to:

- OFX (company), the ASX trading code of the global payments company OzForex Group Limited
- Open Financial Exchange, a file format
- OpenFX (API), a standard for visual effect plugins
