= Jonathan Egstad =

Jonathan D. Egstad is a special effects designer and software developer. He graduated from Fitchburg State College with a degree in communications. He lives in the San Francisco Bay Area with his wife and two sons. In 2005, Egstad was interviewed by Fxguide where they referred to him as "one of the most talented digital effects supervisors in the film industry today."

== Filmography ==
- Æon Flux (2005) (co-visual effects supervisor: Digital Domain)
- I, Robot (2004) (digital effects supervisor: Digital Domain)
- Looney Tunes: Back in Action (2003) (associate visual effects supervisor: Digital Domain)... a.k.a. Looney Tunes Back in Action: The Movie (USA: DVD box title)
- Star Trek: Nemesis (2002) (lead digital compositor)
- The Time Machine (2002) (digital effects supervisor: Digital Domain)
- X-Men (2000) (compositing supervisor: Digital Domain) ... a.k.a. X-Men 1.5 (USA: DVD box title)
- Supernova (2000/I) (digital effects supervisor: Digital Domain) (as Jonathan D. Egstad)
- What Dreams May Come (1998) (digital compositor: Digital Domain) (as Jonathan D. Egstad)
- Titanic (1997) (digital compositor: Digital Domain)
- The Fifth Element (1997) (lead digital compositing supervisor)... a.k.a. Le cinquième élément (France)
- The Island of Dr. Moreau (1996) (digital compositor)
- T2 3-D: Battle Across Time (1996) (digital compositor)... a.k.a. T2: Terminator 2:3-D... a.k.a. Terminator 2: 3-D
- Apollo 13 (1995) (digital compositor) (uncredited)... a.k.a. Apollo 13: The IMAX Experience (USA: IMAX version)
- True Lies (1994) (offline compositing: Digital Domain)

== Awards ==
In 2002 Egstad won an Academy Award for Technical Achievement (w. Bill Spitzak, Paul Van Camp and Price Pethel) for their work on Nuke-2D Compositing Software.
