= Primatte chromakey technology =

Example of chroma key effect.

Primatte is a brand of chroma key software used in motion picture, television and photographic host applications to remove solid colored backgrounds (greenscreen or bluescreen usually) and replace them with transparency to facilitate ‘background replacement’. It uses a unique algorithm based on three multi-faceted polyhedrons floating in RGB colorspace that are used to isolate color regions in the foreground image. Primatte is often referred to as a compositing technology and is usually used as a plug-in for host products such as Adobe After Effects, Adobe Photoshop, Autodesk Media and Entertainment Inferno or Flame, Blackmagic Fusion and several other compositing and editing software packages.

== Workflow ==
Primatte is usually activated on a foreground image with a person or other foreground object filmed or digitized against a solid colored background or backing screen; usually a bluescreen or a greenscreen. The solid colored background area is removed and replaced with transparency. This allows the user to replace the solid colored background with a background image of their choice.

If the foreground object was filmed close to the backing screen or with less than ideal lighting conditions, the foreground object will usually have ‘spill’ somewhere on it. This is most common when filming blonde people against a blue or greenscreen as their translucent hair will absorb the backing screen color. Such ‘colorspill’ can be removed and replaced with several options to achieve a more realistic result.

Another problem is chromakeying images that were created on film stock is that some film stocks have a distinct ‘film grain’ to them. A large amount of film grain will often cause rough edges around the foreground object. Rough edges can be minimized to achieve a smoother transition between the edges of the ‘chroma keyed’ foreground object and the user selected background image.

== History ==
The Primatte algorithm was created by Yasushi Mishima while working at IMAGICA Corporation in Tokyo, Japan in 1992. The basic algorithm utilized in Primatte was originally presented at the 8th NICOGRAPH Conference and the 23rd Imaging Technology Conference and a U.S. patent was granted in 1994.

It was initially released as a stand-alone product on Silicon Graphics workstations but it was later determined to be more useful as a ‘plug-in’ actuated from within a host application. This alleviated the need to save the images, exit the host compositing application, start Primatte, load the images, create the chroma key, save the images, start the host application, load the images and continue creating the composition. Since then it has been ported to almost every major compositing and editing software application on the market. The current version is the fourth generation of the Primatte technology and has features such as ‘Auto-Compute’ that automatically detects the backing screen color, eliminates it and does clean-up on the foreground and backing screen area noise. It is available on the Microsoft Windows, Red Hat Linux, SGI IRIX and the Apple Macintosh platforms.

== The Algorithm ==
The Primatte chromakey algorithm is a method of color space segmentation, where Primatte segments all the colors in the foreground image into one of four separate categories. The result is a 'spill suppressed' foreground image and a matte which is used to apply the modified foreground to a suitable background.

Primatte works in 3D RGB color space. Here is a visual representation of the Primatte algorithm after an image has been processed.

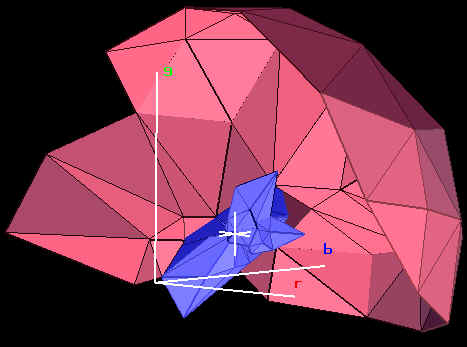
3D Viewer Window

The user essentially creates three concentric, multi-faceted polyhedrons. These can be pictured as three globes (or polyhedrons or polys), one within the other, which share a common center point. The creation of these polyhedrons separates all possible foreground colors into one of four regions; inside the small polyhedron (1), between the small and medium polyhedrons (2), between the medium and the large polyhedrons (3) and outside the large polyhedron (4).

Primatte Algorithm Regions

== See also ==
- Computer Generated Imagery
- Chroma key
- Special Effects
