= OpenFX (software) =

Open-source 3D software

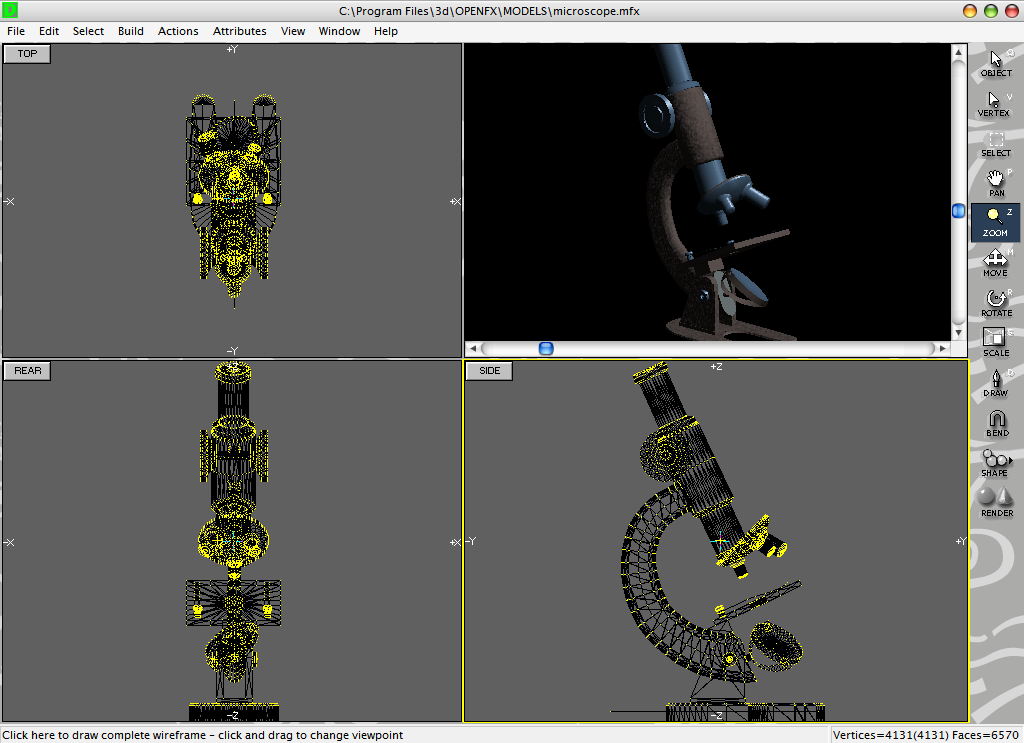
- Original author: Stuart Ferguson
- Release: January 15, 2001; 25 years ago
- Stable release: 2.4 / July 25, 2021; 5 years ago
- Written in: C
- Operating system: Windows
- License: GNU General Public License
- Website: www.openfx.org

OpenFX is an open-source, free modeling and animation studio, distributed under the GNU General Public License, created by Stuart Ferguson. He made the decision to release the source code to the public in the middle of 1999 and released a stable version a year and a half later. The product, formerly named SoftF/X, was renamed to OpenFX.

The OpenFX featureset includes a full renderer and raytracing engine, NURBS support, kinematics-based animation, morphing, and an extensive plugin API. Plugin capabilities include image post processor effects such as lens flare, fog and depth of field. Animation effects such as explosions, waves and dissolves add to the flexibility of the program. Version 2.0 also features support for modern graphics cards with hardware GPU acceleration.

OpenFX supports the Win32 platform, including Windows 2000, XP, Vista, 7 and 8. It can run under Unix-based platforms by using the Wine compatibility layer.

== Release history ==
| Version | Release date | Changes |
|---|---|---|
| Beta | January 15, 2001 | First Public Beta |
| 1.0 | February 9, 2001 | Initial Release |
| 1.1 | July 22, 2004 | Stereo hardware support Stand Alone Model Viewer (OFXVIEW.EXE); A Stereo Movie Viewer (GGPLAY.EXE); A fullscreen .flc and .avi player (DDPLAY.EXE) |
| 1.5 | September 22, 2005 | Better Wave Simulation Plugin; Cubic Environment Support; Removed vertex cap Bug fixes |
| 1.7 | November 3, 2006 | Fixed anti-aliasing problems |
| 2.0 | September 15, 2007 | Hardware rendering support |
| 2.1 | October 4, 2010 | New features in the designer module and a revised more efficient ray-tracer module |
| 2.2 | June 4, 2012 | New Bones and Weights systems for character animation and an improved mapping coordinate painting system. There are also additional imaging effects. |
| 2.3 | October 12, 2012 | OpenF/X is compatible with Windows 8 |
| 2.4 | October 24, 2013 | The main change is the ability to render stereoscopic images and movies. The Renderer control dialog contains a new tick box to render stereo output to either JPS or Left over Right AVI files. The Camera settings in the Animator specifies the eye separation and the parallax depth. Major bug fix in the animator to the Robot Editor windows that caused a crash if the tool was started twice by an accelerator key. |

Plug-in
Video software, such as GenArts Sapphire or RE
Vison Effects which adds a wider variety of effects to a host application.
