= The Foundry Visionmongers =

British visual effects software company

The Foundry Visionmongers Ltd
- Type: Private
- Industry: Software
- Founded: 1996
- Founder: Bruno Nicoletti; Simon Robinson
- Headquarters: London
- Area served: Worldwide
- Key people: Jody Madden, CEO
- Products: Visual Effects and Animation Software
- Owner: Roper Technologies
- Website: foundry.com

Foundry (registered as The Foundry Visionmongers Limited; also known under its former brand name The Foundry) is a British visual effects software development company with headquarters in London.

== History ==
The Foundry Visionmongers was founded in 1996, by Bruno Nicoletti, with Simon Robinson joining soon afterwards.

In 2007, software developers Bill Collis, Simon Robinson, and Ben Kent from Foundry, in association with Anil Kokaram from Trinity College Dublin won a Scientific and Technical Award from the Academy Awards (Oscars) for the design and development of The Furnace, an integrated suite of software tools that provides temporal coherence for enhancing visual effects in motion picture sequences with high robustness, modularity and flexibility.

Foundry was bought by the owners of Digital Domain, Wyndcrest Holdings, in March 2007, and took over DD's existing Nuke business. Subsequently it was subject to a management buyout with backing from Advent Venture Partners, and then acquired by The Carlyle Group in April 2011.

In September 2012, Foundry merged with Luxology, a Mountain View-based software house known primarily for Modo, a 3D modelling and animation package. In 2024, Foundry announced its intention to wind down development of Modo following the release of Modo 17.1.

In May 2015 it was announced that private equity firm HgCapital acquired Foundry from The Carlyle Group "for an enterprise value of £200 million".

Alex Mahon was named CEO in November 2015. She superseded Bill Collis, who remained president and board member. Craig Rodgerson joined Foundry as new CEO in October 2017.

In April 2019, Foundry was acquired by Roper Technologies. Following the change in ownership, in July 2019 Jody Madden was nominated as CEO, taking over from Craig Rodgerson.

== Products ==
Foundry had its origins in plug-in development, and its first product was the Tinder (and later Tinderbox) plugins. This business was sold to GenArts in 2010. Other plugins include Ocula, a set of tools for stereoscopic post-processing, and Keylight, a keyer.

Foundry is best known for Nuke, the industry-standard node-based compositor. The CopyCat machine learning toolset was added in Nuke 13.0, and was nominated for the Emerging Technology Award at the 23rd Annual VES Awards in 2025. A completely rearchitected 3D system, based on Universal Scene Description (USD) was introduced (in beta) in Nuke 14.0, and Variable-enabled workflows was added in Nuke 16.0. The updated 3D system came out of beta in Nuke 17.0 and was joined by an overhauled annotations system.

Mari, a texture painting application was released in July 2010. It was originally developed in-house at Weta Digital.

Katana, a tool for look-development and lighting, originally from Sony Pictures Imageworks, was released in 2011. Recent developments include complete roundtripping to and from USD in Katana 8.0, and the introduction of the UsdSuperLayer framework in Katana 9.0.

Part of the Nuke Family, Hiero, is a timeline and review tool for VFX editorial. The software was designed in-house by Foundry and was released in March 2012. HieroPlayer, a desktop tool for editorial and review, followed in 2014 and was made available for free to anyone with a valid Nuke or NukeX license in 2021.

Flix, a story development tool, was acquired from Sony Pictures Imageworks in 2013. The software was completely rebuilt for Flix 6.0, with a new extension for ToonBoom’s Storyboard Pro introduced in Flix 8.0.

Nuke Stage, a new application purpose-built for virtual production and in-camera visual effects (ICVFX), was announced in 2025. Shortly after, Nuke Stage won Future’s Best of Show Award, presented at the 2025 NAB Show by TVBEurope.

Griptape, a pioneer in enterprise-grade AI orchestration, was acquired by Foundry in 2026.

== Awards and recognition ==
In 2002, Nuke won an Academy Scientific and Technical Award for technical achievement while the product was still at Digital Domain.

In 2013, Katana won an Academy Scientific and Technical Award, also in recognition of technical achievement.

In 2016, Mari was also awarded an Academy Scientific and Technical Award for technical achievement.

In 2018, the Nuke team was awarded a Scientific and Engineering Award by the Academy for the visionary design, development, and stewardship of the Nuke compositing system.

In 2020, Nuke was recognised with an Engineering Emmy Award by the Television Academy.

In 2021, Nuke was awarded an HPA Engineering Excellence Award.

In 2025, CopyCat, Nuke’s machine learning toolset, was nominated for an Emerging Technology Award at the 23rd Annual VES Awards.

Also in 2025, Nuke Stage won Future’s Best of Show Award, presented at the 2025 NAB Show by TVBEurope.
