= Blackmagic Fusion =

Image compositor and post-production software

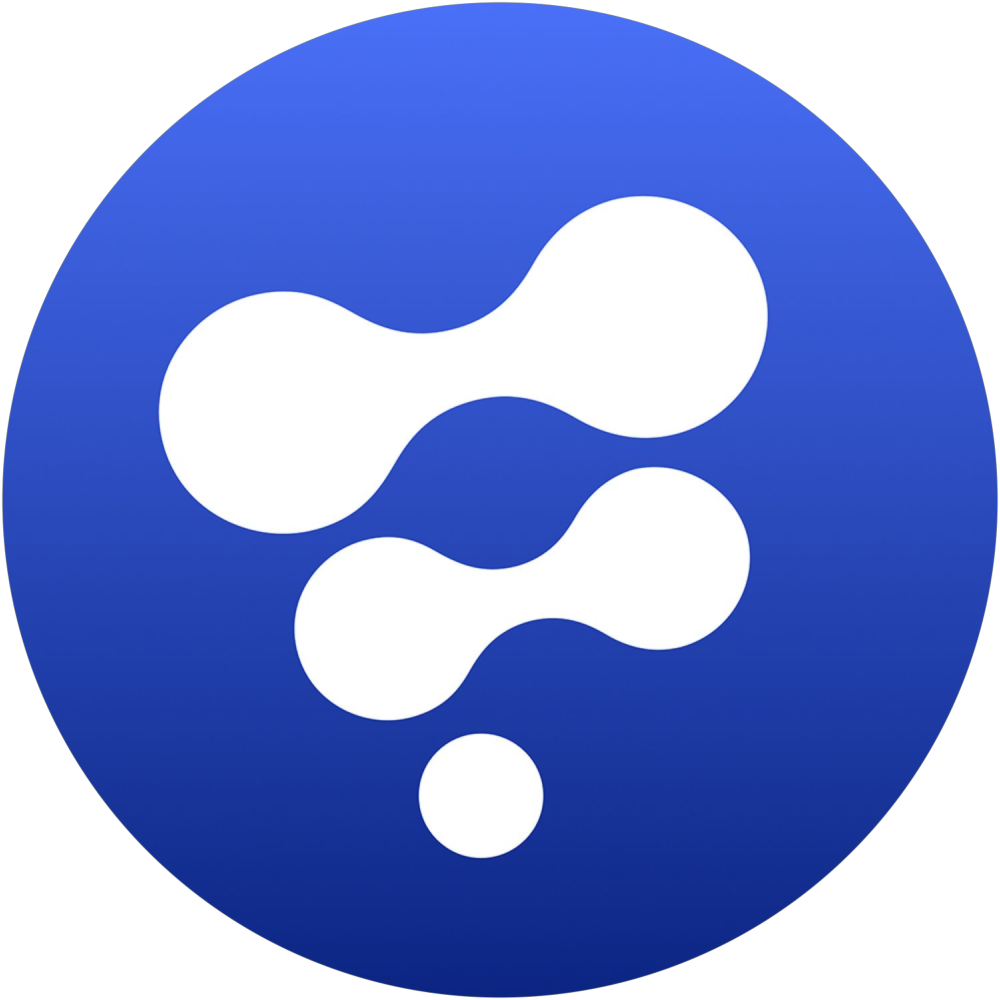

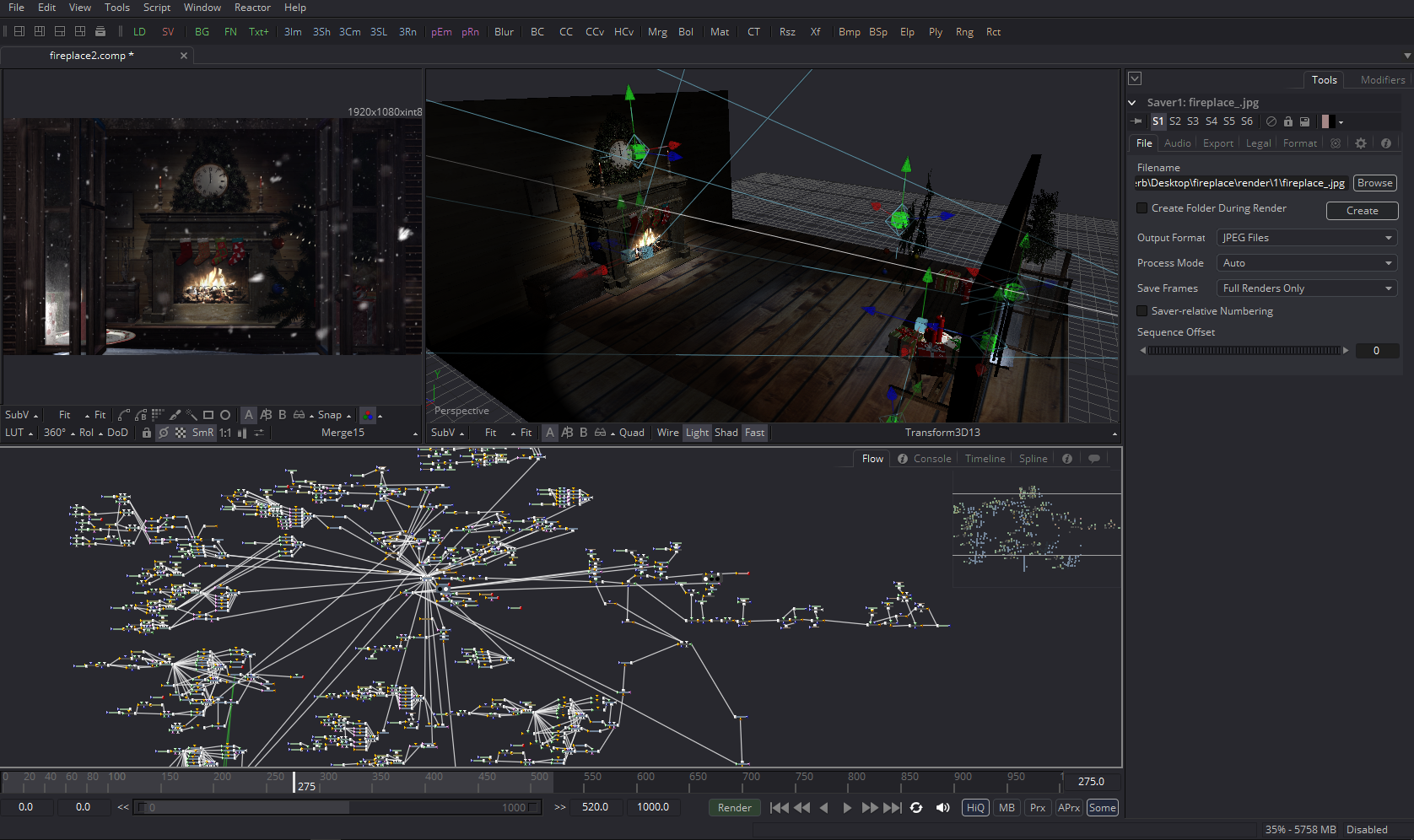
- Fusion 9 3D composition
- Original author: eyeon Software
- Developer: Blackmagic Design
- Stable release: 21.0.2 / 2 July 2026; 14 days ago
- Operating system: Linux, macOS, Windows
- Type: Compositing software
- License: Freeware, commercial
- Website: Official website

Blackmagic Fusion (formerly eyeon Fusion and briefly Maya Fusion, a version produced for Alias-Wavefront) is post-production image compositing developed by Blackmagic Design and originally authored by eyeon Software. It is typically used to create visual effects and digital compositing for movies, TV-series and commercials and employs a node-based interface in which complex processes are built up by connecting a flowchart or schematic of many nodes, each of which represents a simpler process, such as a blur or color correction. This type of compositing interface allows great flexibility, including the ability to modify the parameters of an earlier image processing step "in context" (while viewing the final composite). Upon its acquisition by Blackmagic Design, Fusion was released in two versions: the freeware Fusion, and the commercially sold Fusion Studio.

Fusion is available for Linux, Microsoft Windows, and with the release of Fusion 8, macOS.

== History ==
Fusion was originally developed in 1987 as in-house software developed for use by New York Production & Design (NYPD), a post production and visual effects boutique based out of Sydney, Australia. The very first version of the software was written in DOS and consisted of little more than a UI framework for quickly chaining together the output of pre-existing batch files and utilities. eyeon Software Inc. was formed specifically to commercialize Fusion, and all operations relating to the software were moved to Toronto, Ontario, Canada.

In 2014, Blackmagic Design acquired eyeon Software Inc, and is now developing the Fusion software.

Released in 2018, version 15 of DaVinci Resolve, also developed by Blackmagic Design, added an integrated version of Fusion within the application.

== Version history ==
Official name	version	date of release	comments
Digital Fusion 1.0	1.0	November 1996	First public Windows release (older versions for DOS are not commercially available)
Digital Fusion 1.1	1.1	March 1997	Support for direct hardware playback/preview
Digital Fusion 2.0	2.0	November 1997	Added timeline, 16 bit integer color processing, SCSI tape I/O
Digital Fusion 2.1	2.1	April 1998	Render queue/batch rendering.
Digital Fusion 2.5	2.5	December 1998 – 2000	Network rendering, deep-pixel processing, AE plugin support.
Digital Fusion 3.0	3.0	October 2000 – 2001	UI rewritten, added paint capabilities, advanced text tool.
Digital Fusion 3.1	3.1	January 2002	3D particle system (2.5D UI) introduced, added new color corrector.
Digital Fusion 4.0	4.0	October 2002 – 2004	eyeonscript (Lua based scripting language), float and HDRI color processing, concatenated transforms, nested flow groups, macro tools, new darker UI, OpenEXR, OpenFX plugins.
Fusion 5.0	5.0	August 2005	3D compositing environment, ASCII save files, 16bit float processing, straight node connections.
Fusion 5.1	5.1	December 2006	consoleslave, elbow nodes, multistroke paint.
Fusion 5.2	5.2	July 2007	3D look up tables, fuses (just in time scripted tools), external python scripting, FBX geometry import
Fusion 5.3	5.3	April 2008	64 bit executable
Fusion 6.0	6.0	June 2009 (preview release)	3D material shaders, Region of Interest / Domain of Definition, stereo display
Fusion 6.1	6.1	July 2010	GPU Supercomputing framework
Fusion 6.2	6.2	June 2011	World Position Pass Tools / QuickTime 64 bit support /Linux 64bit / SVG import
Fusion 6.3	6.3	November 2011	Additional color tools / New version of Primatte - 5 / Direct support for "KONA 3G - AJA Video Systems" (already existed as plugin from AJA)
Fusion 6.4	6.4	July 2012	Connect to AVID, new camera formats, advanced 3D and geometry particles, LPeg scripting, PFTrack lens distortion, DirectX view spanning, Windows 8 compatibility.
Fusion 7.0	7.0	June 2014	Animation Indicators, Drag and Drop Layout, User Interface Templates, Learning Environment, Multi Projects/Documents, Connected Node Position and Prediction, Templates, Native Camera Support, Screen Space Ambient Occlusion, 3D Custom Vertex, Alembic Import, Latest FBX Library, Replace Normals 3D, 3D Interactive Splines, 3D Ribbon, UV Render and Super Sampling, 3D Text Bevel Shaper, Dimension – Optical Flow and Stereoscopic Tools, Just-In-time Compiling, Script Development Interface, Linear Light Color/Open Color IO, Roto Onion Skinning
Fusion 7.5	7.5	November 2014	Logo redesign, slight UI changes, addition of Free version lacking stereoscopic 3D, network rendering, and third-party plugin support.
Fusion 8.0	8.0	April 2016	New Mac version, UI redesign including a new darker background colour, new multi-user licenses.
Fusion 9.0	9.0	August 2017	Virtual Reality, Camera Tracking, Planar Tracking, Delta Keyer and Clean Plate, Planar Rotoscoping, Studio Player, New Formats (Support ProRes output for all platforms), GPU Acceleration and over 40 powerful new features.
Fusion	Integration into DaVinci Resolve 15	August 2018	New user interface, Support all plugins for Resolve.
Fusion 16	16.0	April 2019	User interface based on DaVinci Resolve 15; Numerous improvements in the stability and productivity of different tools and the program as a whole.
Fusion 17	17.0	November 2020	Customizable Templates, Automatically Retime Animations, Sync Audio, Vector Shapes, 27 new GPU accelerated Resolve FX tools, Workflow Personalization.
Fusion 18	18.0	July 2022	Custom Poly modifier for creating animatable strokes and masks, New blending modes, Updates to the paint and duplicate tools, Fractional UI scaling, Support for Python 3.
Fusion 18.5	18.5	April 2023	Support for importing Universal Scene Description (USD) files and USD Hydra based renderers including Storm, Introduction of the USD toolset for managing USD assets, New multi-merge tool for compositing multiple layers, Support for a native AI-based depth map tool, GPU accelerated Clean Plate and Anaglyph, Support for OpenEXR DWA compression in saver nodes and BMD Film Gen 5 in CineonLog tool.
Fusion 18.6	18.6	September 2023	Support for 7 new built-in Resolve FX tools for Relight, color transform, ACES transform, gamut mapping and limiting, chromatic adaption and chromatic aberration removal. Multiple USD Enhancements. New MaterialX tools to load .mtlx files and apply them to objects.
Fusion 19	19.0	August 2024	Support for Resolve FX Surface Tracker and Resolve FX Object Removal, Multi Poly tool for easier rotoscoping of complex objects, IntelliTrack AI option for tracking points in Tracker, Support for Open Color IO 2.3., USD improvements for Material X, Improved Text+ and others.
Fusion 20	20.0	May 2025	Support for New Deep image compositing toolset.Multi layer pipelining for OpenEXR, PSD and stereoscopic 3D.Vector warping toolset for image patching and cleanup.MultiText tool with layers and easy transform, clip and wrap controls.Text+ paragraph, line wrapping and bounding tools.Support for 180 VR.Support for ACES 2.0.Support for OCIO 2.4.2 with ACES 2.0 support.3D Scene Dome Light.Support for native Cryptomatte workflows.Support for Film Look Creator.

== Uses ==
Fusion has been used on over 1000 major Hollywood blockbuster feature films as of 2015 as well as on many TV shows, among them:

- Pan's Labyrinth
- 2012
- 300
- 9
- Adventure Time
- Alice in Wonderland
- American Horror Story
- Anonymous
- Avatar
- Avengers: Age of Ultron
- Batman Begins
- Barely Lethal
- Battlestar Galactica
- Black Hawk Down
- Blade: Trinity
- Breaking Bad
- Bunraku
- Captain America: The Winter Soldier
- Clash of the Titans
- Doctor Strange
- Dolphin Tale
- Downton Abbey
- Dragonball Evolution
- Edge of Tomorrow
- Empire
- Fantastic Four: Rise of the Silver Surfer
- Final Destination III
- From Dusk till Dawn: The Series
- G.I. Joe: The Rise of Cobra
- Game of Thrones
- Gangs of New York
- Get Smart
- Ghost Rider
- Gothika
- Gulliver's Travels
- Gnomeo & Juliet
- Gravity
- G-Force
- Green Lantern
- Grimm
- Guardians of the Galaxy
- Hancock
- Happy Feet
- Harry Potter and the Order of the Phoenix
- Hellboy 2
- Hell on Wheels
- Hercules
- His Dark Materials: The Golden Compass
- How to Get Away with Murder
- Hugo
- I, Robot
- Independence Day
- Iron Man
- Immortals
- Jumanji 2
- Journey 2: The Mysterious Island
- Journey to the Center of the Earth
- Kingsman: The Secret Service
- King Kong
- Legion
- London Has Fallen
- Lost
- Maleficent
- Master and Commander
- Minority Report
- Mr. & Mrs. Smith
- Nashville
- NCIS
- NCIS: New Orleans
- Night at the Museum
- Noah
- Oliver Twist
- Orphan Black
- Panic Room
- Poseidon
- Pirates of the Caribbean: Dead Man's Chest
- The Sands of Time
- Prometheus
- Resident Evil: Apocalypse
- RBG
- Saw 3D
- Scandal
- Sin City
- Sky Captain and the World of Tomorrow
- Skyfall
- Snakes on a Plane
- Soul Surfer
- Spider-Man 3
- Splice (film)
- Spy
- Spy Kids II
- Star Wars: Episode I – The Phantom Menace
- Sucker Punch
- Superman Returns
- Soul Surfer
- Teen Wolf
- Terminator Salvation
- The Amazing Spider-Man 2
- The Aviator
- The Chronicles of Narnia: The Voyage of the Dawn Treader
- The Curious Case of Benjamin Button
- The Da Vinci Code
- The Day After Tomorrow
- The Day the Earth Stood Still
- The Expendables 2
- The Forbidden Kingdom
- The Halcyon
- The Hunger Games: Catching Fire
- The Hunger Games: Mockingjay – Part 1
- The Hunger Games: Mockingjay – Part 2
- The Illusionist
- The Imaginarium of Doctor Parnassus
- The Last Samurai
- The League of Extraordinary Gentlemen
- The Matrix Reloaded
- The Matrix Revolutions
- The Martian
- The Mechanic
- The Social Network
- The Terminal
- The Twilight Saga: Eclipse
- The Witch
- Thor (film)
- Titanic
- Tropic Thunder
- Twilight
- Underworld: Awakening
- Underworld: Evolution
- Unknown
- Watchmen
- White House Down
- X2
- X-Men Origins: Wolverine

Fusion has also been used in video games such as Halo 5: Guardians, Destiny: Rise of Iron and Dawn of War III.
