= List of software by Apple =

This list of software by Apple covers software written by Apple Inc., organised by category.

== Archiving, backup, restore, and recovery ==
=== Current ===
- Archive Utility – built-in archive file handler
- Time Machine – built-in backup software

=== Discontinued ===
- Backup – built-in backup software, discontinued in 2012 with MobileMe

== CD and DVD authoring ==
=== Discontinued ===
- DVD Studio Pro – DVD authoring application, the final update was in 2009 and was removed from Final Cut Studio in 2011
- iDVD – a basic DVD-authoring application, last updated in 2010 and incompatible since macOS Catalina dropped 32-bit support in 2019 (previously part of the iLife suite)

== Audio-specific software ==
=== Current ===
- GarageBand – an amateur-oriented digital audio workstation (previously part of the iLife suite)
- Logic Pro – a digital audio workstation (previously part of Logic Studio)
- MainStage – music software for use in live performances
- Shazam

=== Discontinued ===
- Logic Express – a prosumer music production, discontinued in 2011
- Logic Studio – a music-writing studio package, discontinued in 2011 in favour of Logic Pro X
  - Apple Loops Utility – production and organisation of Apple Loops, last updated in 2009 and has been discontinued, with its features integrated into Logic Pro
  - Apple Qmaster – app for automated work distribution for audio-visual rendering and part of both Final Cut Studio and Logic Studio, discontinued as a standalone app and integrated into Compressor. Incompatible since MacOS Catalina dropped 32-bit support in 2019
  - Qadministrator – software to create and manage Qmaster clusters, incompatible since MacOS Catalina dropped 32-bit support in 2019
  - Soundtrack Pro – a musical composition and editing app and part of both Final Cut Studio and Logic Studio, discontinued with the release of Logic Pro 9 and Final Cut Pro X

== Chat (text, voice, image, and video) ==
=== Current ===
- FaceTime – a videoconferencing between Mac, iPhone, iPad and iPod Touch
- iMessage – an instant messaging service between Mac, and other apple devices
- Messages - an instant messaging software application for apple devices utilising SMS, MMS, iMessage and RCS

=== Discontinued ===
- iChat – an instant messaging and videoconferencing application for Macs, discontinued since OS X 10.8 Mountain Lion in favour of FaceTime and iMessage

== Developer tools, frameworks, and IDEs ==
=== Current ===
- Xcode – IDE made by Apple, available for macOS
- MLX – open-source machine learning framework developed for Apple silicon
- Script Editor
- Swift Playgrounds – an educational tool and development environment for the Swift programming language

=== Discontinued ===
- Apple Media Tool – a multimedia authoring tool and programming environment for the Eiffel-based Apple Media Language (AML) object-oriented programming language
- MacApp – an object oriented application framework for the classic Mac OS
- Macintosh Programmer's Workshop – a software development environment for the Classic Mac OS operating system, discontinued in favour of Project Builder
- Project Builder (PBX) – an IDE for software development, rebranded for OS X Panther in 2003 and became Xcode

== Email clients ==
=== Current ===
- Apple Mail – the bundled email client

=== Discontinued ===
- Claris Emailer – classic Mac OS only, no longer supported

== Layout and desktop publishing ==
=== Current ===
- Preview (macOS) – basic image and PDF viewer and editor

=== Discontinued ===
- iBooks Author – an interactive book creating software for Apple Books, discontinued in 2020 and integrated its features into Pages

== Graphic and photo editors ==
=== Current ===
- Photos – a bundled image editing and management application
- Photo Booth – an application for taking and editing photos and videos
- Photomator – a powerful yet easy-to-use photo editor for Mac, iPhone, iPad, and Vision Pro
- Pixelmator Pro – a powerful, easy-to-use image editor that brings professional tools and powerful AI features to everyone across Mac and iPad

=== Discontinued ===
- Aperture – an image editing and organising application, discontinued in 2015.
- iPhoto – a photo editor application, discontinued in 2015. (previously part of the iLife suite)
- MacDraw – a vector graphic drawing application
- MacPaint – a raster graphics editor

== Integrated software technologies ==
=== Current ===
- AVFoundation – a multimedia framework
- Finder – the native file manager for macOS
- Terminal – a command line interface for Macs
- XQuartz – a Mac port of the X11 windowing system (formerly known as X11.app)

=== Former ===
- HyperCard – a software application and development kit for Apple Macintosh and Apple IIGS computers, the last update was in 1998 but was officially discontinued in 2004
- MacTerminal – Telecommunications and terminal emulation application software program. Ceased development following the 1987 spin-off of Apple's software division into Claris.
- MacX – A display server implementation of the X11 windowing system for Macs using the A/UX, System 7, and Mac OS 8 and 9 operating systems. Discontinued in 1998 following the transition to Mac OS X which had native support for X11.
- QuickTime – A multimedia architecture for streaming, encoding and transcoding media. It was deprecated in favour of AVFoundation with OS X Lion.

== Media ==
=== Current ===
- iTunes – a media library and player
- Music – a media player application
- Apple Podcasts – a podcast streaming application
- Apple Books – an e-book reading and store application (previously known as iBooks until iOS 12 and macOS Mojave)

=== Former ===
- Front Row (software) - a media center application for navigating and viewing video, photos, podcasts and music from a computer, optical disc or the Internet

== Networking and telecommunications ==
- Apple Remote Desktop – a remote desktop program

== News aggregators ==
- Apple News – a news aggregator application

== Office and productivity ==
=== Current ===
- FileMaker – a relational database management system
- Calendar – a bundled calendar app (known as iCal until 2012)
- Calculator – a basic calculator application
- Contacts – a computerized address book (known as Address Book prior to Mac OS X Mountain Lion)
- Dictionary
- Grapher – a graphing calculator application bundled with macOS since Mac OS X Tiger
- iWork – suite:
  - Pages – word processor application
  - Numbers – spreadsheet application
  - Keynote – presentation application
- Notes – a note-taking app
- Pixelmator Pro
- Reminders – a task management program

=== Discontinued ===
- AppleWorks – An office suite containing word processor, spreadsheet, and presentation applications. Discontinued in 2007 and replaced by iWork.
- Claris Resolve - a spreadsheet computer program, discontinued in 1994 with support ending in 1995
- MacProject- a project management and scheduling business application, later sold to Claris and officially discontinued in 1998
- MacWrite - word processor application, later sold to Claris and officially discontinued in 1998

== Operating systems ==
=== Current ===
- Darwin – the BSD-licensed and XNU-based core of macOS
- iOS – operating System for iPhones (known as iPhoneOS until version 4 in 2010)
- iPadOS – operating System for iPads (called iOS until version 13.1 in 2019)
- macOS – A Darwin-based Operating system for Macintosh computers. Originally named "Mac OS X" until 2012 and then "OS X" until 2016.
- tvOS – operating System for Apple TV (called Apple TV Software until version 9 in 2015)
- visionOS – operating System for Apple Vision Pro
- watchOS – operating System for Apple Watch
- XNU – a kernel based on Mach that is used as the core of apple operating systems

=== Discontinued ===
- A/UX – a Unix-based operating system for Macintosh computers, discontinued in 1995
- Apple DOS – a disk operating system (DOS) for Apple II, discontinued in 1983 and succeeded by ProDOS
- Apple GS/OS – an operating system for Apple IIGS, it was a core component of System Software (now Classic MacOS) from System 4.0 through System 6.0.1
- Apple Pascal – An operating system based on UCSD Pascal created for Apple's implementation of the Pascal programming language. The final update for it was in 1983 with version 1.1.
- Apple ProDOS – A disk operating system for Apple IIs, with 8-bit and 16-bit versions. Discontinued in 1993, with the 16-bit version succeeded by GS/OS.
- Apple SOS – a disk operating system for Apple III (discontinued after version 1.3 in 1982)
- Classic Mac OS – a series of operating systems developed for Macintosh computers, discontinued in 2001 and replaced with OS X
  - System 1 (discontinued in 1984)
  - System 2, 3 & 4 (discontinued in 1985, 1988, and 1987 respectively)
  - System 5 (final release in 1987, succeeded by System 6 in 1988)
  - System 6 (succeeded by System 7 in 1991, and discontinued in 1992)
  - System 7 (became Mac OS after version 7.6, discontinued in 1997)
  - Mac OS 8 (discontinued in 1999)
  - Mac OS 9 (discontinued in 2001)
- Lisa OS – An operating system based on Apple SOS developed 3 years prior. It was discontinued in 1986 alongside the Lisa line of computers, with System Software being partially based on it.
- macOS Server – the server computing variant of macOS
- MkLinux – an open-source Linux-based software computer operating system, support dropped by Apple in 2002
- Newton OS – a mobile operating system for the Apple Newton, discontinued in 1997

== Text editors ==
- TextEdit – text editor and word processor

== Utilities ==
=== Current ===
- Activity Monitor – native system monitor for hardware and software with task manager functionality
- Automator – built-in, utility to automate repetitive tasks
- Files
- Stickies – put Post-It Note-like notes on the desktop

=== Discontinued ===
- Dashboard – Built-in macOS widgets, removed in macOS Catalina. With macOS Sonoma in 2023, widgets were reintroduced through the Notification Center.
- Grab – built-in macOS screenshot utility, replaced with another tool in macOS Mojave
- iSync – syncing software, bundled with Mac OS X up to version 10.6
- Sherlock – File searching (version 2), web services (version 3). Discontinued with the introduction of Mac OS X Leopard.

==== Support for non-Macintosh software ====
- Boot Camp – A multi-boot utility built into macOS from 10.5 Support dropped in transition from intel macs to Apple silicon.

== Video ==
=== Current ===
- Apple TV app – a media player software program
- DVD Player – DVD player software built into macOS
- Final Cut Pro – video-editing software (formerly part of Final Cut Studio)
- Final Cut Camera - pro video recording app
- iMovie – basic video editing application (previously part of iLife suite)
- QuickTime Player

=== Discontinued ===
- Clips
- Final Cut Express – A video editing suite, a prosumer version of Final Cut Pro. Discontinued in 2011 in favour of Final Cut Pro X.
- Final Cut Studio – audio-video editing suite:
  - Cinema Tools
  - Compressor
  - LiveType
  - Motion 2
- QuickTime Pro – Video editor and encoder. Support was dropped in 2018 when 32-bit support was dropped.

== Stores ==
- App Store – an app marketplace for iOS and iPadOS apps
- Mac App Store – an app marketplace for macOS apps

== Others ==
- Apple Intelligence – an artificial intelligence suite integrated into Siri in iOS 18 and macOS 15 Sequoia (Apple Silicon Macs only)
- Classroom
- Clock
- Safari – a graphical web browser based on WebKit
- Find My – an asset tracking app and service utilising Bluetooth and UWB
- Font Book – a font manager
- Health
- Launchpad – an application launcher
- Apple Maps – a web mapping app and service
- Shortcuts
- Siri – a virtual assistant
- Translate
- Weather

=== Discontinued ===
- AppleLink/eWorld – Client software to access Apple's online service for its dealers, third-party developers, and users. The service was discontinued in 1997.
- iWeb – a HTML editor for creating websites and blogs, discontinued in 2012 alongside MobileMe (previously part of the iLife suite)

== Software for non-Apple operating systems ==
=== Current ===
- Apple Music (Windows)
- Apple Maps (Web)
- iTunes (Windows)
- Apple Devices – a Microsoft Windows app for managing Apple devices
- Apple TV (Windows)
- iCloud (Windows, Online)
- Photos (Windows, Online)
- Find My (Online)

=== Discontinued ===
- Safari (Windows)
- QuickTime (Windows)

== See also ==
- List of built-in iOS apps
- List of built-in macOS apps
- List of Swift software and tools
