= List of Apple pro apps =

Type of professional application by Apple

Below is a list of Apple's collection of professional multimedia applications, marketed as pro apps.

Access to all apps is included with an Apple Creator Studio subscription. Access to the apps can also be purchased individually through one-time purchases on the App Store.

The Apple Creator Studio versions of the apps contain additional content and features not present in the one-time purchase versions.

== Current apps ==
=== Music ===
- Logic Pro, a digital audio workstation for professional music production
- MainStage, a companion app to Logic Pro for live music performances

=== Photo ===
- Pixelmator Pro, a professional digital photography management and post-production application

=== Video ===
- Compressor, a video and audio encoding tool
- Final Cut Pro, a non-linear professional video editing app
- Motion, a motion graphics, titling, and compositing app

== Discontinued apps ==
=== Music ===
- Apple Loops Utility, a Loops organizer and manager
- Logic Studio, a suite of professional music production applications, which included Logic Pro
- Soundtrack Pro, a post-production app to create film soundtracks
- WaveBurner, an app for CD authoring

=== Photo ===
- Aperture, a professional digital photography management and post-production application

=== Video ===
- Apple Qmaster, a distributed visual effects processing tool
- Apple Qadministrator, used to create and manage clusters of Qmaster jobs
- Batch Monitor, a tool to view and monitor batch encoding tasks
- Cinema Tools, a database for film conforming
- DVD Studio Pro, a tool for DVD authoring
- Final Cut Studio, a suite of professional video editing applications, which included Final Cut Pro
- LiveType, a title animation utility
- QuickTime Pro, an enhanced version of QuickTime featuring more advanced tools and some export tools
- Shake, a digital compositing package used in the movie post-production industry
