= Apple certification programs =

Certification programs made by Apple Inc

Apple certification programs are IT professional certifications for Apple products. They are designed to create a high level of technical proficiency among Macintosh service technicians, help desk support, technical support, system administrators, and professional users. Apple certification exams are offered at Prometric testing centers and Apple Authorized Training Centers, as well as online through Pearson Vue.

== Hardware Certifications ==
These certifications are designed for individuals interested in becoming Apple service technicians, help desk, desktop support, or Macintosh consultants who need all-around experience in servicing Macintosh computers. It includes two separate certifications.

=== Apple Certified Macintosh Technician ===
This certification is for the repair and diagnostics of all Macintosh desktops, portables, and servers. This certification is required to perform warranted hardware repairs for an Apple Authorized Service Provider.

Required exams

- Apple Service Fundamentals Exam (Pearson Vue exam: #SVC-16A)
- ACMT 2016 Mac Service Certification Exam(Pearson Vue exam: #MAC-16A)

Previously, the hardware certification came in the combination of Apple Certified Desktop Technician (ACDT) and Apple Certified Portable Technician (ACPT), but has been combined into a single hardware certification. This certification also includes an extensive knowledge of Apple's operating system OS X 10.6 Snow Leopard including its installation, settings, troubleshooting, and applications.

Before November 2014, the Apple Certified Macintosh Technician did not cover the Retina MacBook Pro lineup, as well as all Macs released after 2012. To repair a Late-2013 13-inch MacBook Pro with Retina Display, one must be an Apple Certified Macintosh Technician and pass an exam for repairing 13-inch Retina MacBook Pros (Late 2013 to Early 2015). All technicians who received certification after November 20, 2014 are certified to repair any Mac released before 2015.

=== Pro Apps certifications ===
These certifications are designed for individuals who need a high skill-level in the use of Apple's pro applications or for professionals who provide support for Final Cut Pro software and peripheral devices.

Apple Certified Pro

- Final Cut Pro X
- Logic Pro X
- Logic Pro X 10.1
- Motion 5 (Level One)

== IT Professional Certifications ==
These certifications are designed for IT professionals who support Mac OS X or who perform Mac OS X desktop support and troubleshooting, such as help desk staff, system administrators, service technicians, and service desk personnel. Each certification is specific to the version of OS X it relates to; an administrator who was qualified as ACTC for OS X 10.4 Tiger is not an ACTC for 10.6 Snow Leopard. Recertification exams are available to speed the process of moving from one version to the next. OS X 10.6 exams were only available until 31 May 2012, when they were withdrawn.

=== Apple Certified Technical Coordinator (ACTC) ===
This certification is designed for system administrators who provide support to OS X users, as well as maintain the OS X Server platform.

Required exams

- OS X Support Essentials v10.6 through v10.10
- OS X Server Essentials v10.6 through v10.10

The ACTC certification pathway was withdrawn for new students in 2015.

=== Apple Certified System Administrator (ACSA) ===
This certification is catered for system administrators managing large multiplatform IT networks using Mac OS X Server and other Apple technologies. The ACSA program has been changed to offer individuals more flexibility and is now focused on individual job functions. Each passed exam earns a specialization certificate and a specific number of credits toward ACSA certification, which requires a total of 7 valid (unexpired) credits. OS X 10.6 is the last version to have this certification, there is no equivalent for OS X 10.7 Lion.

Required exams

- Mac OS X Server Essentials v10.6 (Prometric exam: #9L0-510, withdrawn May 31, 2012)
- Mac OS X Deployment v10.6 (Prometric exam: #9L0-623, withdrawn May 31, 2012)
- Mac OS X Directory Services v10.6 (Prometric exam: #9L0-624, withdrawn May 31, 2012)
- Mac OS X Security & Mobility v10.6 (Prometric exam: #9L0-625, withdrawn May 31, 2012)

=== Apple Certified Media Administrator (ACMA) ===
Verifies in-depth knowledge of Xsan architecture, including an ability to install and configure systems, architect and maintain networks, customize and troubleshoot services, and integrate Mac OS X, Final Cut Server, and other Apple technologies within an Xsan installation. ACMA certification is for system administrators and technicians working for resellers, post houses, studios or other large facilities. To earn ACMA status, students must pass three required exams and one elective exam as outlined below.

Required Exams

- Mac OS X Server Essentials v10.6 (Prometric exam: #9L0-510)
- Xsan 2 Administration (Prometric exam: #9L0-622, withdrawn May 31, 2012)
- Final Cut Server Level One (Prometric exam: #9L0-980)

Plus one of the following:

- Mac OS X Support Essentials v10.6 (Prometric exam: #9L0-403, withdrawn May 31, 2012)
- Mac OS X Directory Services v10.6 (Prometric exam: #9L0-624, withdrawn May 31, 2012)
- Mac OS X Deployment v10.6 (Prometric exam: #9L0-623, withdrawn May 31, 2012)
- Final Cut Pro Level One (Prometric exam: #9L0-827)
- Apple Certificate Support Pro (ACSP 10.11) OS X El Capitan (iLearn: Advance ACSP resource)

=== Xsan 2 Administrator ===
Verifies comprehensive knowledge of Apple's SAN file system for Mac OS X. An Xsan Administrator is responsible for the life cycle of Xsan, including installation, deployment, infrastructure. To earn Xsan Administrator certification, students must pass one exam. Xsan 2 exams are only available until 31 May 2012, when they will be withdrawn following Apple's integration of Xsan into OS X Server 10.7.

Required Exam

- Xsan 2 Administration (Prometric exam: #9L0-622, withdrawn May 31, 2012)

== Associate Certifications ==
Certified Associate certifications are designed for professionals, educators and students to validate their skills in Apple's digital lifestyle and authoring applications and iWork.

=== Apple Certified Associate in iWork ===
Required exam

- iWork Level One (Prometric exam: #9L0-806)

== List of Apple certification programs ==
- Apple Authorized Training Centers (AATC)

=== Hardware ===
- Apple Certified Macintosh Technician (ACMT)
  - Apple Certified Desktop Technician (ACDT)
  - Apple Certified Portable Technician (ACPT)

=== Trainers and Training Centers ===
- Apple Certified Trainer (ACT)
- Apple Authorized Training Centers (AATCs)
- Apple Authorized Training Centers for Education (AATCEs)

==== Software Certifications ====
- Apple Certified Pro
  - Final Cut Pro
  - Final Cut Express
  - Color
  - DVD Studio Pro
  - Motion
  - Logic Pro
  - Shake
  - Color Management
  - Xsan for Pro Video
  - Aperture
  - Soundtrack Pro
- Apple Certified Master Pro
  - Final Cut Studio
  - Logic Studio

==== Mac OS X and IT certifications ====
- Apple Certified Support Professional (ACSP)
- Apple Certified Technical Coordinator (ACTC)
- Apple Certified System Administrator (ACSA)
- Apple Certified Specialist (ACS)
- Apple Certified Media Administrator (ACMA)
- Xsan 2 Administrator

== See also ==
- Apple Specialist
- Genius Bar
- One to One (service)
- Cisco Career Certifications
- Microsoft Certified Professional
- Oracle Certification Program
- Red Hat Certification Program
