= Final Cut =

Final cut or Final Cut may refer to:

- Final Cut, non-linear video editing software by Apple Inc.
  - Final Cut Pro, current version
  - Final Cut Express, now discontinued
  - Final Cut Server, now discontinued
  - Final Cut Studio, a discontinued professional video and audio production suite
- "Final Cut" (Battlestar Galactica), a 2005 episode of Battlestar Galactica
- Final Cut (1980 film), an Australian film by Ross Dimsey
- Final Cut (1998 film), a British film starring Jude Law
- Final Cut (2022 film), a French zombie comedy film
- Final Cut (novel), a 2020 novel by S. J. Watson
- The Final Cut, a 1983 album by Pink Floyd
- The Final Cut (2004 film), a film starting Robin Williams
- Final Cut of Director, a 2016 Indian Hindi film
- Final cut privilege or final cut right, a film industry term, usually meaning the right of a director to final approval of any edits.
- Final Cut, a novel featuring the Hardy Boys

== See also ==
- Director's cut (disambiguation)
- The Final Cut (disambiguation)
