= One to One (Apple) =

Former Apple service

One to One was a fee-based service for private training at Apple retail stores. A US$99 one-year membership with purchase of a new Mac allows the user to receive a year's worth of Mac, iPhone, iPod, and iPad instruction. The only restriction is that users can only book one each of the three types of sessions that are included with the One to One program at a time. The three session types are a 30- or 60-minute Personal Training session, where the individual is taught by an Apple employee, a 90-minute Group Training where an Apple employee leads a group of people on a particular topic, and a 90-minute Open Training session where the customer is able to work on their own project in a group and ask for assistance as needed. The sessions offer instruction in the following topics: Getting Started on Your Mac, Getting Started on Your iPad, Getting Started on Your iPhone, iCloud, Mail Contacts & Calendars, iPhoto, GarageBand, iMovie, iTunes, Pages, Keynote, Numbers, Aperture, Final Cut Pro, Motion, and Logic Pro.

Originally this service was part of ProCare, but on May 2, 2007, was severed and became its own separate US$99 service. Existing ProCare members were given One to One memberships for the remainder of their ProCare subscription.

Apple's One to One service was officially retired in 2015, with the final renewals ending on December 17.
