= Joint venture (disambiguation) =

A joint venture is an entity formed between two or more parties to undertake economic activity together.

Joint venture may also refer to:

- International joint venture, a joint venture with parties in different countries
- Joint Venture (album), an album by the Kottonmouth Kings
- HSV-X1 Joint Venture, a high-speed catamaran operated by the United States Navy and Army between 1998 and 2004
- JointVenture (Apple), a service from Apple that superseded ProCare

== See also ==
- Common purpose or joint enterprise
- Joint venture broker
