= Director's cut (disambiguation) =

Director's cut is an alternate edit of a film.

Director's cut may also refer to:

== Music ==
- The Director's Cut, a 2001 album by Fantômas
- Director's Cut (Helldorado album), 2004
- Director's Cut (Kate Bush album), 2011
- "Director's Cut", a song by Amaranthe from their 2011 album Amaranthe
- Director's Cut (Seventeen album), 2017
- The Director's Cut, a 2020 album by Currensy and Harry Fraud

== Other uses ==
- Director's Cut (2016 film), a crowdfunded film starring Penn Jillette
- Director's Cut (2024 film), an English-language horror slasher film
- Let's Make a Movie, also titled Director's Cut, a 2010 American independent comedy-drama film
- The Director's Cut (radio show), a movie radio show and podcast
- "Director's Cut, an episode of Home Movies
- Sonic Adventure DX: Director's Cut
- Director's Kut Productions, Indian production company

== See also ==
- Final cut (disambiguation)
