= Shake (software) =

Discontinued image compositing package

- Shake box art
- Developer: Apple Inc.
- Final release: 4.1.1 / November 21, 2008
- Operating system: Mac OS X and Linux
- Type: Compositing
- License: Proprietary
- Website: Apple — Shake at the Wayback Machine (archived January 22, 2008)

Shake is a discontinued image compositing package used in the post-production industry developed by Nothing Real for Windows and later acquired by Apple Inc. Shake was widely used in visual effects and digital compositing for film, video and commercials. Shake exposed its node graph architecture graphically. It enabled complex image processing sequences to be designed through the connection of effects "nodes" in a graphical workflow interface. This type of compositing interface allowed great flexibility, including the ability to modify the parameters of an earlier image processing step "in context" (while viewing the final composite). Many other compositing packages, such as Blender, Blackmagic Fusion, Nuke and Cineon, also used a similar node-based approach.

Shake 4 was available for Mac OS X and Linux. Support for Microsoft Windows and IRIX was discontinued in previous versions.

On July 30, 2009, Apple discontinued Shake. No direct product replacement was announced by Apple, but some features are now available in Final Cut Studio and Motion, such as the SmoothCam filter.

== History ==
In 1996, Arnaud Hervas and Allen Edwards founded Nothing Real, and released Shake 1.0 as a command-line tool for image processing to high-end visual effects facilities in early 1997.

Emmanuel Mogenet joined the R&D as a senior developer in the summer of 1997 as Shake 2.0 was being rewritten with a full user interface. In the fall of 1997, Dan Candela (R&D), Louis Cetorelli (head of support) and Peter Warner (designer/expert user) were added to the team. After initially working as a consultant in early 1998, Ron Brinkmann also joined in early 1998 as a product manager. This core group was all among the original Sony Imageworks employees.

Shake 2.0 was first shown at the 1998 NAB conference as an alpha demo with a minimal set of nodes, a node view and the player. A more complete beta version of Shake was shown at the 1998 SIGGRAPH conference.

Version 2 was released in early 1999 for Windows NT and IRIX, costing $9900 US per license, or $3900 for a render-only license. Over the next few years, Shake rapidly became the standard compositing software in the visual effects industry for feature films.

In 2002, Apple Computer acquired Nothing Real. A few months later, version 2.5 was released, introducing Mac OS X compatibility. To strengthen the Mac's position in production studios, the Mac version held a price of US$4,950 (equivalent to $8,861 in 2025), and users of the non-Mac operating systems were given the offer of doubling the number of licenses at no extra cost by migrating to Mac OS X. In 2003, version 3 of Shake was announced, which introduced the Qmaster software, discontinued support for Microsoft Windows, and allowed unlimited network render clients at no additional cost. A year later, the release of Shake 3.5 at the National Association of Broadcasters show saw the price drop to $2999 for Mac OS X and $4999 for Linux and IRIX.

In April 2005 Apple announced Shake 4 at a pre-NAB event. New features included 3D multi-plane compositing, 32-bit Keylight and Primatte keying, optical flow image processing (time-remapping and image stabilization), Final Cut Pro 5 integration and extensions to their open, extensible scripting language and SDK. Shake 4 had no IRIX version.

At the NAB event in April 2006, Apple announced that Shake 4.1 would be a Universal Binary version and would ship in May that year. It was actually released on June 20, 2006 and was rebranded as a companion for Final Cut Studio; as such, its price was dropped from $2999 to $499 for Mac OS X but remained the same for Linux. At the same time, Apple announced that they would end support for Shake. Rumor web sites claimed that Apple was working on a next-generation compositing application codenamed Phenomenon. Existing maintenance program subscribers had the option to license the Shake source code for US$50,000 (equivalent to $79,853 in 2025).

Shake's final release, version 4.1.1, was issued in 2008 to make it compatible with revised Apple 16-bit QuickTime codecs that used a different byte order (Endianness) than they had previously.

On July 30, 2009, Apple removed Shake from its online store and website. Shake had been officially been declared end of life status 3 years prior but continued being sold in the Apple Store for $499 until that time. The Shake website now redirects to Apple's Final Cut Pro X website.

== Uses ==
Shake was used in such films as Peter Jackson's The Lord of the Rings and King Kong, as well as Harry Potter films and Cloverfield. It was used by The Embassy to create a television advertisement for Citroën with a dancing car. Shake was used by Broadway Video for restoring the release of Saturday Night Live: The Complete First Season DVD box set. It was in use by CBS Digital for creating new visual effects for Star Trek Remastered.

Other major productions using Shake include the 2005 adaptation of War of the Worlds, Star Wars: Episode III – Revenge of the Sith, Fantastic Four, Mission: Impossible III, Poseidon, The Incredibles, Hulk, Doctor Who, The Dark Knight and Pirates of the Caribbean: Dead Man's Chest, and for the restoration of South Pacific.

Shake was used for video post-production, but in this field Autodesk's Flint, Flame, and Inferno systems were usually used in conjunction with Shake for a fast turnaround of projects. Shake's historical strength had been the ability to work better with very high resolution formats such as 2K, 4K, and IMAX used in the motion picture industry.
