= DVcreators.net =

DVcreators.net is a Los Angeles–based company providing training, software and other resources for digital video producers.

== History ==
DVcreators.net was founded in 1998 by Josh Mellicker and Michelle Mellicker. In February 1999, DVcreators.net was contacted by Apple to help launch their professional video application division. After receiving a beta version of Final Cut Pro, DVcreators.net produced the first Final Cut Pro training product, Final Cut Pro PowerStart, which was released the same day Final Cut Pro was released at the NAB trade show in 1999.

In the summer and fall of 1999, DVcreators.net hosted two U.S. Apple seminar tours on Final Cut Pro and related products from Canon and other manufacturers, as well as producing two interactive CD-ROMs for Apple. DVcreators.net also helped Apple design marketing materials and trained Apple development executives on video and presenting Final Cut Pro, and DVcreators.net has been credited with many inside and outside Apple as being a major factor in the early adoption of Final Cut Pro by the editing community, inspiring the formation of many user groups, websites and training companies.

== Workshops ==
In 1999, DVcreators.net launched 3-day filmmaking workshops called “The DV Revolution Workshop”, one of the world's best known short form digital video production/post-production workshops. This workshop has since been taught in 60 cities in 5 countries to over 10,000 attendees.

In 2001, DVcreators.net hosted and managed Apple’s first hands-on training lab on the floor of the NAB show. In 2002, DVcreators.net organized and executed the biggest digital video free seminar tour in industry history, with over 160 events across the U.S., sponsored by Canon, Intel, Discreet, and others.

== Current ==
Currently, DVcreators.net offers training via IP, instructor-led classes, and software, including DV Kitchen web video publishing software, and PromptDog and PromptPuppy teleprompting software.
