= Don Capria =

American film director

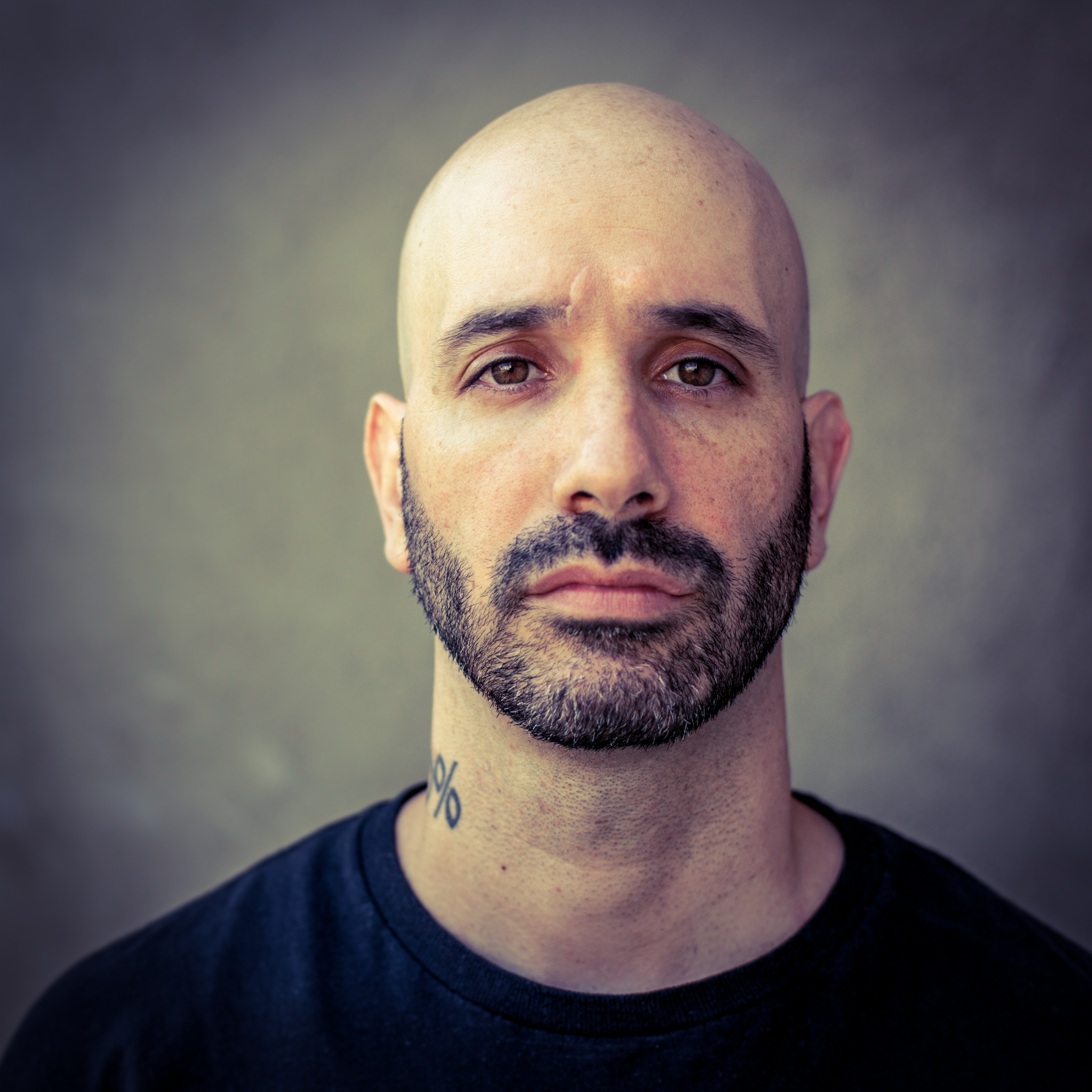
- Born: White Plains, NY
- Occupations: Writer, Director and Artist Manager
- Writing career
- Notable work: Colombo: The Unsolved Murder

Don Capria is an American writer, director and artist manager. He is best known for his true-crime biography on Mafia boss Joseph Colombo.

== Early life ==
Capria was born in Westchester County, NY. After high school he was a drummer in the hardcore punk scene in the bands; Blindside and Skarhead.

== Career ==
Later on Capria began working as an artist manager with Hip hop and hardcore/ punk acts. In 2000, he founded the music management company 1:10 Artist Management representing artists, G Fella, Kitty Kat, Jamie Drastik and Danny Diablo A short time after he began directing music videos. Capria wrote and directed the TV Pilot Westchester; an autobiographical story about his experiences as a manager and a music promoter. In 2014, Capria directed the short film, Eulogy, starring Federico Castelluccio. The film won "Best Ensemble" in the 2015 Queens World Film Festival. In 2015 Capria co-authored "Colombo: The Unsolved Murder" - a true crime biography on the life of Mob Icon Joe Colombo. In 2021 he wrote and directed the post-viral-apocalypse independent horror "Anecdota" (2021). In 2023 Capria filmed his first feature film "Director's Cut" (2024) in Westchester, New York. The horror/slasher follows an emo/punk band that ventures into the woods of P.A. to film a music video but it never seen again. The film was played in theaters on OCT, 31st 2024 and was acquired by Freestyle Digital Media and released on digital HD internet, cable and satellite platforms and DVD on March 18th, 2025.

=== 1:10 Artist Management ===
Capria and partner, Alex Shenitsky, re-launched their music management company 1:10 Artist Management in 2012. They currently represent EDM Pop Dance artist Dawin and Trap / Punk artist Black Punk.

== Bibliography ==
- Colombo: The Unsolved Murder. 2015. ISBN 978-0692583241
