= Apple Creator Studio =

Creativity app bundle subscription by Apple

- Developer: Apple
- Release: January 28, 2026
- Operating system: iOS; iPadOS; tvOS; macOS; visionOS; watchOS
- Platform: iPhone; iPad; Apple TV; Apple Watch; Mac; Vision Pro
- Predecessor: iWork, Pro apps
- Type: Subscription service bundle
- License: Proprietary
- Website: www.apple.com/apple-creator-studio/

Apple Creator Studio is a subscription service provided by Apple that bundles several premium and freemium productivity services and software together. It was launched on January 28, 2026. The subscription gives access to all of its current pro apps applications, and allows users to access additional content and capabilities on applications in the iWork suite and Freeform app.

The subscription competes with other services, including Adobe Creative Cloud, Microsoft 365, and Google Workspace.

== History ==
Apple announced the Creator Studio on January 13, 2026. The suite consolidates Apple's premium software into one subscription, although the individual applications will remain available for purchase or free download on macOS. Both the subscription and standalone versions can be installed at the same time. To visually distinguish between the one-time purchase and subscription versions of the apps, Apple Creator Studio versions of the pro apps applications on Mac utilize different icons.

== Software and services ==
These applications vary by device availability.

Name	Description	Availability		
Name	Description	iOS	iPadOS	macOS
Final Cut Pro	Video editor	No	Yes	
Logic Pro	Digital audio workstation (DAW)	No	Yes	
Pixelmator Pro	Graphics editor	No	Yes	
Keynote	Presentation program	Yes		
Pages	Word processor	Yes		
Numbers	Spreadsheet	Yes		
Freeform	Digital whiteboard	Yes		
Motion	Motion graphics designer	No		Yes
Compressor	Media encoder and compressor	No		Yes
MainStage	Live music performance processor	No		Yes

== Reception ==
Following the announcement of Creator Studio, multiple outlets praised the lower pricing compared to Adobe Creative Cloud, but were critical over the failure to include an alternative to Adobe Lightroom, like Aperture or Photomator.
