= Nothing Real =

Software company

Nothing Real L.L.C was a company founded in October 1996 by Allen Edwards and Arnaud Hervas which developed high-end digital effects software for the feature film, broadcast and interactive gaming industries. It was purchased in February 2002 by Apple for its flagship digital effects software, Shake.

== History ==
In 1996, Allen Edwards and Arnaud Hervas founded Nothing Real in Venice Beach, California. The company released Shake 1.0 as a command-line tool for image processing to high-end visual effects facilities in early 1997. Edwards and Hervas met in 1990 working in the R&D of Thomson Digital Images, a Paris company and maker of Explore, a 3D software. In 1993, they were among the early employees at Sony Pictures Imageworks in Los Angeles, and later worked at early Weta in New Zealand on the film "The Frighteners" for Peter Jackson. Their experiences from both the software development and user sides led them to begin development of Shake as a high-speed, high-quality tool specifically designed for the feature film visual effects industry.

Emmanuel Mogenet joined the R&D as a senior developer in the summer of 1997 as Shake 2.0 was being rewritten with a full user interface. In the fall of 1997, Dan Candela (R&D), Louis Cetorelli (head of support) and Peter Warner (designer/expert user) were added to the team. After initially working as a consultant in early 1998, Ron Brinkmann also joined that spring as product manager. This core group were all among the original Sony Imageworks employees.

Shake 2.0 was first shown at the 1998 NAB conference as an alpha demo with a minimal set of nodes, a node view and the player. A more complete beta version of Shake 2.0 was shown at the 1998 SIGGRAPH conference.

Version 2 was released in early 1999 for Windows NT and IRIX, costing $9900 US per license, or $3900 for a render-only license. Over the next few years, Shake rapidly became the standard compositing software in the visual effects industry for feature films.

In 2000, Shake version 2.1 cost US$9,900 plus an annual maintenance fee of approximately US$1,500. The additional render-only license cost US$3,900. The software was available for Linux, Irix and Windows NT.

Apple Computer's purchase of Nothing Real in 2002 changed the way in which Shake was marketed and sold. Apple released Shake for Mac OS X and lowered the price to US$4,950 with an annual maintenance fee of US$1,199. Apple continued to lower Shake's price over the years. In 2006, Apple released Shake 4.1 for US$499 with no annual maintenance fee. On July 30, 2009, Apple discontinued Shake.
