= Apple Qmaster =

Video effects processing software from Apple Inc.

- Developer: Apple Inc.
- Stable release: 3.5.2 / July 19, 2010; (13 years ago)
- Operating system: OS X
- Type: Distributed processing
- License: Proprietary
- Website: Apple Qmaster website

Apple Qmaster is a system made by Apple Inc. that provides automated work distribution and processing for high-volume projects created with certain digital visual effects software packages: Shake, Autodesk Maya, Final Cut Pro, Compressor, DVD Studio Pro and any UNIX command-line program. It processes such jobs on a cluster of Macs or Xserves.

== History ==
Qmaster was introduced as part of Shake 3, to complement the Rendezvous (now Bonjour) networking technology. It was later available with Shake and as part of DVD Studio Pro (until those products were discontinued in 2011), and is now available exclusively with Compressor.

Qmaster clusters could be created and managed using Apple's Qadministrator app, which was included with Shake, Final Cut Studio and Logic Studio.

== External links and references ==
- Apple Qmaster Support
- Apple Qmaster 3 manual (PDF)
- Macworld Tutorial for simple setup
