= The Final Cut =

The Final Cut may refer to:

- The Final Cut (album), a 1983 album by Pink Floyd
  - "The Final Cut" (song), a 1983 song by Pink Floyd
  - The Final Cut (1983 film), a video EP by Pink Floyd
- The Final Cut (band), an industrial music group
- The Final Cut (1995 film), a film starring Sam Elliott
- The Final Cut (2004 film), a film by Omar Naim starring Robin Williams
- The Final Cut (TV serial), a part of the BBC House of Cards trilogy
- "The Final Cut" (Buffy comic), a comic book story based on the Buffy the Vampire Slayer television series
- The Final Cut (Judge Dredd novel), a novel by Matt Smith

== See also ==
- Final Cut (disambiguation)
