= Final Cut Server =

- Developer(s): Apple Inc.
- Final release: 1.5 / July 23, 2009
- Operating system: Mac OS X
- Type: Video editing software
- License: Proprietary
- Website: Archived 2011-03-28 at the Wayback Machine

Final Cut Server is Apple's discontinued server-based backend for managing Final Cut Studio files (particularly Final Cut Pro) and for workflow automation. Based on Proximity's artbox package, Final Cut Server includes media asset management tools with access controls and was designed to catalog any media file type and allow addition of custom metadata to make those files searchable. Final Cut Server runs on macOS, and is accessed through a Java client and QuickTime framework running on Windows and macOS. Apple announced the discontinuation of the software in June 2011, replacing it with Final Cut Pro X.

== Release ==
Arising from Apple's acquisition of the Proximity Group in 2006, the development of Final Cut Server was announced in April 2007 at NAB 2007. It was released in early April 2008, with pricing at $999 for the 10-client license and $1,999 for the unlimited client license.

On July 23, 2009, v1.5 was released, coinciding with an update to Final Cut Studio. The upgrade changed the pricing structure by eliminating the original 10-client license and reducing the cost of the unlimited client license to $999. Upgrades from Final Cut Studio v1.1.1 to v1.5 for both the unlimited license and the older 10-client license were $299. With the purchase of the upgrade, the 10-client license was converted into an unlimited client license. Feature updates in version 1.5 included the addition of global searches accessible to a workgroup, integration of Active Directory permission sets, updated search engine performance and further proxy settings. Version 1.5.2, which includes some fixes, was released in May 2010.

In June 2011, Apple announced the discontinuation of Final Cut Server, as Final Cut Studio was discontinued in favor of Final Cut Pro X.

== Reception ==
In 2008, Macworld said of version 1.1, "Final Cut Server has powerful, flexible, and easy-to-use catalog and searching capabilities", has heavy integration with Final Cut Studio, and is better than other asset management systems by dynamically updating even from many small distributed volumes not directly connected to the server. However, there were some usability concerns. In 2010, Definition magazine's extensive review praised it as transformative to even a single editor's workflow, from end to end, especially in synchronizing multiple workstations.
