= Apple Loops Utility =

Software by Apple

- Tagging window
- Developer: Apple
- Stable release: 3.0.1 / 2009
- Operating system: Mac OS X
- Type: Audio utility
- License: Proprietary
- Website: www.apple.com/logicstudio/production-utilities/

The Apple Loops Utility software was a small companion utility for Soundtrack Pro, GarageBand, Logic Express, and Logic Pro, all made by Apple, that allowed users to create loops of audio that could be time-stretched. Audio files converted to Apple Loops via Apple Loops Utility could also be tagged with their publishing (Author, Comments tagged at the same time, a process known but it would convert the latter to AIFF when saved with tagging information).

The most recent version available without purchasing the software was 3.0.1, which was available from Apple's developer web site. Version 1.4, which was the first version of the software, was available with Logic Pro or Express 7.2. It allowed multiple files to have multiple tags added to them, and it also allowed content merging to occur with Logic Audio Express. Only version 1.4 and beyond worked natively with Intel Macs. Version 1.3.1 appeared to allow edits to be made and file information to be saved, but none of the essential tagging information could be retained on an Intel Mac. Version 3.0.1, the last one released, fully supported Intel Macs up to macOS Sierra 10.12.6.

== External links and references ==
- Apple Loops Utility (DMG)
- Apple Loops Utility SDK 3.0.1 (DMG)
- "Apple Loops Utility Manual(PDF)" (PDF). Archived from the original (PDF) on December 13, 2005.
