= Director's Cut (2024 film) =

Director’s Cut
- Written by: Don Capria
- Starring: Louis Lombardi, Danielle Kotch, Tyler Ivey, Lucy Hart
- Cinematography: Bliss Bussant
- Edited by: Noah Marks
- Music by: John Patrick Kennedy
- Production company: 110 Crew Films
- Distributed by: Freestyle Digital Media
- Release date: October 31, 2024
- Running time: 90 minutes
- Country: United States
- Language: English

Director's Cut is a 2024 horror slasher English language film written and directed by Don Capria. The film features Louis Lombardi as a mysterious director who offers to shoot a music video for a Long Island punk band.

== Production and background ==
Don Capria conceived Director’s Cut while filming a metal band's music video in an abandoned facility in Pennsylvania. Capria wanted to present a cautionary tale about young artists willing to sacrifice everything for fame after his career in the music industry as an artist manager. Filming took place in October 2023, primarily at the William Boyce Thompson Museum in Yonkers, New York. A White Plains local, Capria collaborated with production staff, editors, and special effects teams from the area. His experience managing young artists influenced the film's theme, highlighting the risks they face in the industry.

== Plot ==
A Long Island punk band connects with a mysterious director on social media who offers to film their first music video for free. Eager for exposure, they accept and travel to an abandoned mansion in Pennsylvania. There, they meet “Mister Director,” an unsettling figure who pressures them with alcohol and pries into their past.

The next day, the band arrives late to set, angering the director, whose strict demands lead to a confrontation with the singer. Doubt sets in, but they decide to continue, unwilling to walk away. Their choice soon proves to be a deadly mistake.

== Cast ==
- Louis Lombardi as Mister Director
- Lucy Hart as Babs
- Tyler Ivey as Jay Francis
- Haley Cassidy as Jen Zoco
- Louis Rocky Bacigalupo as Juan
- Brandy Ochoa as Menace
- Greg Poppa as John
- Danielle Kotch as Val
- Darin Hickok as AJ
- Danny Diablo as Meth Dealer 1
- Robert Jacob as Meth Dealer 2

== Release and reception ==
Director's Cut was released in selected theaters on October 31, 2024, with a subsequent video-on-demand release. Before its release in theaters, Director's Cut was premiered at the Chicago Horror Film Festival and Bushwick Film Festival. The film has been noted for its homage to horror cinema of the 1980s and 1990s.

The film received mixed to positive reviews from critics. Rue Morgue praised its blend of slasher and psychological horror elements, noting its effective use of tension and practical effects. Variety included it in a list of recommended horror films for October 2024, citing its nostalgic appeal. PopHorror commended Louis Lombardi's performance but criticized some of the film's pacing and character development.
