= LiveType =

Title sequence creation software by Apple Inc.

- Developer: Apple Inc.
- Stable release: 2.1.4 / September 1, 2007
- Operating system: Mac OS X
- Type: Video editing
- License: Proprietary
- Website: Final Cut Pro X

LiveType was a computer program developed by Apple Inc. to create animated title sequences for video projects. It was discontinued with the release of Final Cut Pro X, Motion 5, and Compressor 4.

== History ==
LiveType originated from a product called "India Titler Pro," by the Oregon-based company Prismo Graphics, founded by Tom Langmacher and Mary Massey (now Mary Wolf). Prismo Graphics hired Dave Howell of Pablo Media to write the software's code. Prismo Graphics, as well as the software, was acquired by Apple in June 2002.

The program first appeared as part of Final Cut Pro 4 in April 2003. It was updated to version 1.2 in the following year; this version was then included in Final Cut Express HD in 2005. Version 2 of LiveType was then released with version 5 of Final Cut Pro, and this was included in version 3.5 of Final Cut Express in May 2006. The program was packaged with Final Cut Studio until version 3. LiveType 2.1 was still packaged with Final Cut Express 4.

== Features ==
LiveType 2 includes over 11 gigabytes of content - including fonts, textures, objects, templates and effects. It can import any standard media files and can create text tracks whose style can be meticulously specified. In the canvas, the contour that the text follows can be edited, so that the titles can be on curved or shaped paths. All attributes of each title or character can be changed and keyframed, including the size, drop shadow, outline, extrusion, glow, opacity and tracking of the text.

=== LiveFont ===
A 'LiveFont' is one of the program's key features. These are fonts with animated characters. Examples of the LiveFonts shipped with LiveType are animated handwriting, smoke writing, fire, and blinking LED characters. It is also possible to create custom LiveFonts, but the necessity of generating a separate movie file for each letter makes the file sizes very large.

=== Templates ===
Apart from text, there is a wide range of animated objects and textures that can be added to a sequence, and there are a number of templates - such as title themes and lower thirds - in both PAL and NTSC formats that can be opened. Any image or movie file can also be placed and edited oMacWorld Review of India Titler Pro 1.0 in the canvas.
