= Logic Studio =

2007–2011 music production suite by Apple

- Logic Pro, part of Logic Studio
- Developer: Apple
- Stable release: Logic Pro 11.1.2 / (August 6, 2025)
- Operating system: Mac OS X
- Type: Music production
- License: Proprietary
- Website: apple.com/logicstudio

Logic Studio is a discontinued professional music production suite by Apple. The first version of Logic Studio was unveiled on September 12, 2007. It claims to be the largest collection of modeled instruments, sampler instruments, effect plug-ins, and audio loops ever put in a single application.

The package contains Logic Pro, Mainstage, Soundtrack Pro, WaveBurner, Studio Instruments, Studio Effects, Apple Loops, Apple Loops Utility, Impulse Response Utility, Compressor, and QuickTime Pro. It also contains 6 content DVDs containing Jam Pack collections, sound effects, surround music beds, EXS24 samples, and impulse response files and a demo content DVD.

On December 8, 2011, it was announced that the boxed version of Logic Studio suite would be discontinued. Instead, Logic Pro and Mainstage would be sold separately on the Mac App Store. Soundtrack Pro was discontinued as part of the move.

== Components ==
=== Apple Loops Utility ===
Apple Loops Utility
- Developer: Apple
- Stable release: 1.4
- Operating system: Mac OS X
- Type: Audio utility
- License: Proprietary
- Website: apple.com/logicstudio/production-utilities/

The Apple Loops Utility software is a small companion utility to Soundtrack Pro, GarageBand, Logic Express, and Logic Pro, all made by Apple Apple Loops Utility allows users to create loops of audio that can be time-stretched. Audio files converted to "Apple Loops" via the Apple Loops Utility can also be tagged with their publishing (Author, Comments, etc.) and musical information (Key, Tempo, etc.). Multiple files can be tagged at the same time, a process known as batch tagging. Apple Loops Utility can read both AIFF and WAV file formats, but it will convert the latter to AIFF when saved with tagging information.

=== Compressor ===
Compressor
- Developer: Apple
- Stable release: 3.5.2 / March 24, 2010; 16 years ago
- Operating system: Mac OS X v10.5/10.4
- Type: Data compression
- License: Proprietary
- Website: apple.com/finalcutstudio/compressor

Compressor is a video and audio media compression and encoding application for use with Final Cut Studio and Logic Studio on Mac OS X. It can be used with Qmaster for clustering. Compressor is used for encoding MPEG-1, MPEG-2 for DVD, QuickTime .mov, MPEG-4 (Simple Profile), MPEG-4 H.264 and optional (third Party and often commercial) QuickTime Exporter Components to export to Windows Media, for example. Among its other features is the ability to convert from NTSC to PAL and vice versa, and the ability to 'upconvert' from standard-definition video to high-definition video with feature detail detection to prevent serious quality losses.

=== Impulse Response Utility ===
The Impulse Response Utility is used to create custom convolution reverbs.

=== Logic Pro ===
Logic Pro
- Developer: Apple
- Stable release: 9.1.8 / October 24, 2012
- Operating system: Mac OS X
- Type: MIDI sequencer + digital audio workstation
- License: Proprietary
- Website: www.apple.com/logicstudio/logicpro/

Logic Pro is a hybrid 32 / 64 bit digital audio workstation and MIDI sequencer software application for the Mac OS X platform. Originally created by German software developer Emagic, Logic Pro became an Apple product when Apple bought Emagic in 2002. Logic Pro provides software instruments, synthesizers, audio effects and recording facilities for music synthesis. It also supports Apple Loops – royalty-free professionally recorded instrument loops. Audio effects include distortions, dynamics processors, equalization filters, and delays. The Space Designer plugin simulates the acoustics of audio played in different environments, such as rooms of varying size, or producing the echoes that might be heard on high mountains. Logic Pro can work with MIDI keyboards and control surfaces for input and processing, and for MIDI output. It features real-time scoring in musical notation, supporting guitar tablature, chord abbreviations and drum notation.

The application features distributed processing abilities, which can function across an Ethernet LAN. One machine runs the Logic Pro app, while the other machines on the network run the Logic node app. Logic will then offload the effects and synth processing to the other machines on the network. If the network is fast enough (i.e. gigabit Ethernet) this can work in near-real time, depending on buffer settings and CPU loads. This allows users to combine the power of several Mac computers to process Logic Pro’s built-in software instruments and plug-ins, and 3rd party processing plug-ins.

=== MainStage ===
MainStage
- Developer: Apple
- Stable release: 2.2.1 / February 28, 2012
- Operating system: Mac OS X
- Type: MIDI sequencer and Virtual instrument host
- License: Proprietary
- Website: https://www.apple.com/logicstudio/mainstage/

MainStage's primary purpose is to serve as a method of centralizing any virtual instruments that users might have installed on their computers that are normally used in Apple's DAW software Logic Pro for use in live performance.

The instruments can then be played using a pre-recorded MIDI file or via a MIDI controller such as a keyboard. MainStage's other features include the ability to play back pre-recorded backing tracks and to function as a guitar and vocal multi-effects processor.

The second version, MainStage 2, was released on July 23, 2009, along with updated releases of many of the other applications in the Logic Studio package.

=== Soundtrack Pro ===
Soundtrack Pro
- Developer: Apple Computer
- Stable release: 3.0.1 / November 2, 2010
- Operating system: Mac OS X
- Type: Digital music creator and audio editor
- License: Proprietary
- Website: apple.com/finalcutstudio/soundtrackpro/

Soundtrack Pro is a music composing and audio editing application made by Apple, which includes a collection of just over 5000 royalty free professional instrument loops and sound effects. The program also allows multitrack projects to be exported directly with Compressor settings.

=== Waveburner ===
WaveBurner
- Developer: Apple
- Stable release: 1.6.1 / November 4, 2009
- Operating system: Mac OS X v10.6/Mac OS X v10.4
- Type: Multimedia Content Creator
- License: Proprietary
- Website: Apple’s Logic Utilities page

WaveBurner can be used for assembling, mastering, and burning audio CDs. Audio CDs created with WaveBurner can be played back on any audio CD player, and can be used as premasters to produce CDs in large numbers for possible distribution.

WaveBurner has several notable features:

- Allows for up to 99 tracks and 99 subindexes per track
- Includes ISRC codes for each track
- Includes copy prevention and pre-emphasis for each track
- Adds UPC/EAN codes for the CD
- Supports CD-Text
- Create DDP (CD-image)

== System requirements ==
According to Apple, one needs to meet the following requirements to install all applications:

- Mac computer with an Intel processor (PPC is supported prior to v9.1.11)
- 2GB of RAM (4GB or more recommended)
- Display with 1280x768 or higher resolution
- Mac OS X v10.6.8 or later
- QuickTime 7.6 or later
- DVD drive for installation
- 9GB to install all applications and required content
  - Additional 38GB to install all optional content (large content packages can be installed on separate disk):
    - 10GB for Jam Pack collections
    - 16GB for sound effects
    - 6GB for surround music beds
    - 6GB for other optional content

== See also ==
- Logic Express
- Logic Pro
- Logic Control
- Audio Units
- Core Audio
- GarageBand
- Comparison of multitrack recording software
