= ProCare =

Former service by Apple Computer

ProCare was a service offered by Apple Computer for use at Apple retail stores providing enhanced access to services from the Genius Bar. ProCare had an annual membership fee of US$99 for use with up to three Apple computers. Among the services included with membership were scheduling of Genius Bar reservations up to 14 days in advance (vs. 3 days for non-members) and faster turnaround times for in-store repairs. ProCare membership also included personalized setup of new machines, a yearly 'tune-up' and 'backup consultation'.

ProCare previously included individualized training and instruction on a variety of topics relating to Apple computers and software, but as of May 2, 2007, this was spun off as a separate training service called One to One.

On March 3, 2011, the ProCare service was superseded by Joint Venture from Apple.
