= La Línea: Shadow of Narco =

2020 documentary television series

- Genre: Documentary
- Country of origin: Spain
- Original language: Spanish
- No. of seasons: 1
- No. of episodes: 4

Production
- Running time: 29-37 minutes

Original release
- Release: 9 September 2020

La Línea: Shadow of Narco is a 2020 docuseries in Spanish that aired on Netflix. It is a 4 part documentary about drug smuggling in Spain.

== Story ==
It is about a drug-smuggling hotspot in La Linea, a beach town in Spain. La Linea de la Concepcion sits in the shadow of the rock of Gibraltar, a natural wonder that serves as a backdrop to countless boats smuggling drugs from Morocco into Europe. This series tags along with law officers trying in vain to enforce the law.

== Episodes ==
No.	Title	Directed by	Original release date
1	"Episode 1"	Pepe Mora	September 9, 2020
2	"Episode 2"	Pepe Mora	September 9, 2020
3	"Episode 3"	Pepe Mora	September 9, 2020
4	"Episode 4"	Pepe Mora	September 9, 2020

== Release ==
La Línea: Shadow of Narco was released on September 9, 2020, on Netflix.
