= Compressor (software) =

Media compression and encoding app

- Logos for the one-time purchase version (left) and Apple Creator Studio version (right)

- Compressor v4.5 on macOS 10.15.7 screenshot and logo
- Developer: Apple
- Stable release: 5.4 / September 29, 2026; 42 days ago
- Operating system: macOS (26.6 or later)
- Type: Data compression
- License: Proprietary
- Website: apple.com/final-cut-pro

Compressor is a video and audio media compression and encoding application for macOS made by Apple.

== History ==
The application used to be available as part of Final Cut Pro, Soundtrack Pro, Motion, and DVD Studio Pro, and after Apple combined its professional media products into Final Cut Studio and Logic Studio bundles, Compressor became part of these bundles.

Once the bundle model was abandoned by Apple in 2011, a new major version of Compressor (Compressor 4) was released as a separate product on the Mac App Store for $49.99. The bundle model was later reintroduced in 2026, available as part of the Apple Creator Studio subscription suite, alongside the standalone purchasable Mac App Store version.

== Features ==
Compressor is used for encoding video and audio media in multiple formats, including HEVC (H.265), MPEG-1, MPEG-2 for DVD, QuickTime .mov, MPEG-4 (Simple Profile), MPEG-4 H.264 and optional (third Party and often commercial) QuickTime Exporter Components to export to Windows Media. Among its other features are the ability to convert from NTSC to PAL and vice versa, and the ability to upscale from standard-definition video to high-definition video with feature detail detection to prevent serious quality losses. Filters and effects, such as de-noising or timestamp generation, can be applied to video during the conversion process, and the video can be cropped.

Compressor could be used with the discontinued Qmaster for clustering, or configured as a server to work on the jobs submitted by other computers on the network.

With its update to 4.2 in April 2015, Apple added performance upgrades, as well as the ability to use Compressor to produce a compliant package to submit video content for distribution to the iTunes Store.

Compressor supports creating files for Blu-ray discs.

== External links and references ==
- Apple Compressor 4
- Apple Compressor 2 User Manual (PDF)
- New Features in Compressor 2 (PDF)
