= Soundtrack Pro =

Former music software from Apple Inc.

- Developer: Apple Computer
- Final release: 3.0.1 / October 22, 2009; 17 years ago
- Operating system: Mac OS X
- Type: digital music creator and audio editor
- License: Proprietary
- Website: www.apple.com/fr/finalcutstudio/soundtrackpro/

Soundtrack Pro is a discontinued music composing and audio editing application made by Apple Inc. It included a collection of just over 5,000 royalty free professional instrument loops and sound effects for use. The software was featured in the Logic Studio and Final Cut Studio software bundles; It was discontinued with the release of Final Cut Pro X, Motion 5, and Compressor 4.

== History ==
An earlier incarnation of the package, Soundtrack, was first sold as part of Apple's Final Cut Pro 4 video editor, released in April 2003. It was then released as a stand-alone product, but due to low demand it was discontinued. The main concept of Soundtrack was to allow people who are not professional composers to produce original music for their videos or DVDs, royalty-free. The music could be easily scored to QuickTime movies and Final Cut Pro projects. Soundtrack was reinstated in January 2005 as part of Final Cut Express HD. Soundtrack and all future versions contains a DVD of Apple Loops that were also part of the GarageBand Loops.

Also see a release history in context with the rest of Final Cut Studio.

=== Version 1 ===
Soundtrack Pro was introduced on April 17, 2005 as a stand-alone product and as part of the Final Cut Studio suite, where it integrates with Final Cut Pro. Soundtrack (non-Pro) was removed from Final Cut Pro. There was also an upgrade package for users of Soundtrack. As of January 10, 2006, the stand-alone product has been dropped again. Soundtrack Pro adds features for professional audio engineers and sound designers, and focuses more on sound editing than the original Soundtrack.

Since September 2007 Soundtrack Pro also comes as part of the Logic Studio bundle, Apple's own audio and midi sequencing software. But it was removed from Logic Studio when Logic Pro was moved to the App Store on December 8, 2011.

=== Soundtrack Pro 2 ===
Soundtrack Pro 2 is included in Final Cut Studio 2 (2008).

=== Soundtrack Pro 3 ===
Soundtrack Pro 3 is included in Final Cut Studio (2009).

== Features ==
Soundtrack Pro has two main modes: multitrack mode and editing mode.

=== Multitrack mode ===
Multitrack mode is where the royalty-free instrument loops and sound effects can be arranged in synchronisation with the video track, and where narration or other external audio sources can be recorded. There are both single and multi-take recording features. As with all of Apple's loop arranging software, the project's master key and tempo can be set, and all of the loops will automatically be played at those settings, regardless of the key and tempo at which they were originally recorded. At the same time, the key and tempo for the whole project can be varied over time with the master envelopes.

Envelopes are a sequence of keyframes that can be applied to audio parameters. Each individual track has envelopes for volume and pan by default. Adding keyframes to these envelopes (effectively lines that run beneath each track) allows the parameters to be varied over time. Each track can also have filters and effects applied to it; these could be Audio Units or Logic Pro plug-ins - examples of those included are Compressor, Multipressor, Flanger, Space Designer and Ringshifter. Every parameter of these effects can also be automated (that is, changed over time).

In addition, there is a mixer interface. Using the 'touch' or 'latch' modes, changes to volume, pan and effects parameters can be recorded in real time as the project plays. Soundtrack Pro also supports external hardware mixers, or control surfaces.

=== Audio editing mode ===
The audio editing mode, with actions list.

The audio-editing mode is where individual clips can be edited. The waveform, as well as a frequency spectrum, can be viewed for the clip. The audio can be analyzed for common audio problems such as clicks and pops, power line hum and clipped signals, and then any discovered problems can be fixed. Audio can be faded in and out, the amplitude can be altered for a selection, noise can be removed and silence, waveforms and ambient noise can be inserted. There is also a selection history tool that cycles between previous selections. After zooming in on the individual samples in the audio waveform, the pen tool can be used to edit the wave directly. There is a time-stretch tool for changing the speed of a clip, or a part thereof.

Sound editing in the application is based on actions. The actions performed on a clip, such as reversing it, inverting it or normalizing it, are listed on the left-hand side, where they can be reviewed, disabled, reverted or re-ordered. Unchecking the check box for one action removes its effect (and the waveform changes animatedly to reflect the change). Moving the purple tag upwards cycles back through the actions history.

The program also features AppleScript automation and batch processing, for which it also provides actions for Mac OS X v10.4's Automator application.

=== Integration ===
Soundtrack Pro is designed to be used in combination with Final Cut Pro, both of which are included in the Final Cut Studio box set. It supports a 'roundtrip' workflow, in which Final Cut Pro sequences can be exported as small reference files that include scoring markers. These reference files are then dragged from Soundtrack Pro's Browser tab to the video pane. The video track includes thumbnails of the video at each scoring marker (not where there were scene breaks in Final Cut). Once the soundtrack is finished, it is exported as a mix (i.e. all the tracks are flattened together) and can then be imported into Final Cut. If the soundtrack needs to be changed, the Soundtrack Pro project file can be re-opened at any time, but the changes will only show up in Final Cut when the mix has been re-exported (to the same file).

The program also allows multitrack projects to be exported directly with Compressor settings.

==== Usages ====
Some of the loops made it to the mainstream, most notably was the usage by Lady Gaga on Just Dance using some of the loops (2:58 into the track)

The Sci-Fi ringtone shipped on every iPhone was also taken from the Apple Loops DVDs.

== See also ==
- Walter Murch, an editor who advocated for Soundtrack Pro.
- GarageBand, a similar program aimed at home users.
- Logic Express, a similar program aimed at amateur musicians (prosumers).
- Logic Pro, a professional music-production application.
