= MainStage (software) =

Music application by Apple

- Logos for the one-time purchase version (left) and Apple Creator Studio version (right)

- A screenshot of MainStage 3
- Developer: Apple
- Release: September 12, 2007; 19 years ago
- Stable release: 4.3.1 / August 13, 2026; 2 months ago
- Operating system: macOS (15.6 and later)
- Platform: x86-64 (as of MainStage 2.1); ARM64 (as of MainStage 3.5)
- Size: 6 GB (plus 72 GB of optional content)
- Available in: English, French, German, Japanese, Korean, Simplified Chinese, Spanish
- Type: MIDI sequencer and virtual instrument host
- License: Proprietary
- Website: apple.com/mainstage

MainStage is a music application developed by Apple designed for use in live performance. It is a part of the Apple Creator Studio suite of applications.

== Features ==
MainStage works in a similar way and has a similar user interface to Logic Pro, although the focus is on live use rather than features like recording and editing that are available in a DAW such as Logic. Instead of a timeline for instance, there is an editable "Workspace". This allows a user to drag out an object that acts as a software representation of a hardware controller like a button, knob or fader and assign that to a parameter such as volume, pan or even more complex things. MainStage comes bundled with a number of sampled software instruments (such as pianos, guitars, drum kits and pads) as well as effects. These instruments can be played using a pre-recorded MIDI file or via a controller device that uses the MIDI protocol, such as a keyboard or drum pad. It can also act as a "host" and centralize any third-party virtual instruments or audio units that users might have installed on their computers. Virtual instruments that can be used with MainStage can also be used with Logic Pro.

A MainStage concert can display a patch list which displays all the patches created by a user for that concert. Each patch might have a different instrument or effect assigned to it and various parameters can be changed during a performance by cycling through the list.

Other features include:

- Recording of any audio signal passing through.
- Multi-effects processing for external inputs (e.g. a guitar or a microphone/vocals).
- Playback of pre-recorded backing tracks.
- MIDI transformation via MIDI FX plugins and routing via external instrument channel strips.

== Release history ==
The first version of MainStage was introduced on September 12, 2007, alongside Logic Studio.

The second version, MainStage 2, was released on July 23, 2009, along with updated releases of many of the other applications in the Logic Studio package. Version 2.1 released in January 2010, introduced a 64-bit mode. Since version 2.2, updates are available only from the Mac App Store.

MainStage 3 was released alongside Logic Pro X on July 16, 2013, as a paid update and available only as a download from the Mac App Store. There is a free iPad companion app available designed for use with Logic Pro X, MainStage 3 and GarageBand, which can act as a hardware controller for various parameters.

With the release of the version 3.5 on November 12, 2020, the long-standing compatibility with OS X 10.9 or later was dropped due to the new requirement of Metal; MainStage became only available for 10.15 or later. With the release of the version 3.6 on March 14, 2022, MainStage was only available for Big Sur and Monterey, until version 3.6.5 released in November 2023 dropped support for Monterey and the software was only available for Ventura (13.5 or later) and Sonoma. Latest update of MainStage 3 (version 3.7.1) released in March 2025 supported Sonoma (14.4 or later), Sequoia and Tahoe.

The fourth major version of the software, MainStage 4, was released on January 28, 2026. It is available for Sequoia (15.6 or later) and Tahoe.

== See also ==
- Logic Pro
- GarageBand
- Ableton Live
