= DVD Studio Pro =

- Developer: Apple Inc.
- Final release: 4.2.2 / July 23, 2009
- Operating system: macOS
- Type: DVD Authoring
- License: Proprietary
- Website: apple.com/finalcutstudio/dvdstudiopro

DVD Studio Pro is a discontinued high-end software tool published by Apple Inc. to allow users to create DVD masters to be sent out for replication at production houses. Its tight integration with other Apple applications allowed users to take Final Cut Pro and Motion projects and render them into the DVD format without encoding to intermediary formats.

== History ==
Apple bought Astarte's DVDirector in 2000, re-releasing it as DVD Studio Pro in 2001. Version 1.5, still based on this original code, was released in April 2002. In the meantime Apple had acquired Spruce Technologies in 2001, and was retooling the DVD authoring package that came with that acquisition (DVD Maestro). In August 2003, Apple released DVD Studio Pro 2, with a new interface. DVD Studio Pro 3 was released in 2004.

In April 2005, Apple updated DVD Studio Pro to support authoring HD content. DVD Studio Pro 4 allowed for the burning of HD DVD content to both standard DVDs and HD DVD media (even though no HD DVD burners were available for Macintosh). For playing back HD DVD content burned to a standard DVD, Apple requires a PowerPC G5, Apple DVD Player v4.6, and Mac OS X v10.4 or later. Version 4 was the first version to drop support for Mac OS 9.

In January 2006, Apple stopped offering DVD Studio Pro as a stand-alone product, selling it only as part of the Final Cut Studio suite. The 4.0.3 update, released in the same month, upgrades the program to the finalized HD DVD 1.0 specification. It also supports the native H.264 specification. The 4.2 update, which shipped with the Final Cut Studio 2 release, was simply a compatibility update and did not add any major new features.

== Features ==
DVD Studio Pro has a graphical "map" view, which shows all the menus, tracks and scripts in the project as color-coded tiles, with the connections between them as arrows. New menus, layered menus, scripts and slideshows can be created from this view and arranged; and the item that will play first on the DVD can be set. Assets (i.e. photos, sounds and Motion projects) are imported into the asset manager and can then be dragged and dropped into one or more places within the project (creating a link to the asset rather than duplicating it). Menus can be created with templates, or pre-made buttons, and with the help of dynamic guidelines they can be kept in a grid arrangement.

Other features include:

- Subtitle creation
- Implementation of CSS and Macrovision copy protection for SD DVDs
- Editing of GPRM and SPRM registers
- Disabling certain functions on particular menus
- Creating multiple language versions of a menu
- Creating multiple versions ("stories") of a video project, for example, a director's cut
- DVD@CCESS feature for web links in menus
- A range of transition effects to set between menus

== Workflow ==
The video project is typically sent from Final Cut Pro to Compressor, where it can be converted into the DVD MPEG-2 format with Dolby Digital (ac3) or AIFF sound. Menus with motion graphics can be created in Motion. It is possible to set the menu's loop point in either Motion or DVD Studio Pro; likewise it is possible to define chapters within either Final Cut Pro or DVD Studio Pro. The menus and the encoded video assets are imported into the application and the menu system is constructed; afterwards it can be simulated in a mock DVD player interface. The final VIDEO_TS or HVDVD_TS directory for the DVD can be created using the "Build" feature. The "Format" function takes this directory and writes it to a disc or disk image. Alternatively, a sample DVD can be burnt to disc in one step.
