= Cinema Tools =

Discontinued film management software from Apple Inc.

- Developer: Apple Inc.
- Final release: 4.5.1 / March 24, 2010; 16 years ago
- Operating system: macOS
- Type: Video editing
- License: Proprietary
- Website: Final Cut Pro - Apple

Cinema Tools is a software program for filmmakers, to use in conjunction with Final Cut Pro. It facilitates the creation of an integrated film database, allowing the management of film material through telecine.

== Overview ==
Cinema Tools is software bundled with Final Cut Studio that combines film database tools with conversion tools. It is used to log and keep track of film as well as to reverse telecine or perform advanced pulldown from standard 30 frames per second to 24 frames per second. Since NTSC standards are 29.97 frame/s (frames per second), digital formats must be recorded via telecine to NTSC standard from the 24 frame/s source. Cinema Tools pulls out the redundant frames and/or fields associated with the footage and converts it back to its native 24p format.

== History ==
The application was developed by Loren Kary and originally released as FilmLogic before being purchased by Apple. The application was released by Apple in 2002 as a stand-alone product . It was then included as part of version 4 of Final Cut Pro (see press release).

See also a release history in context with the rest of Final Cut Studio.
