= Logic Pro =

Digital audio workstation

- Logos for the one-time purchase version (left) and Apple Creator Studio version (right)

- A screenshot of Logic Pro X running on macOS Mojave
- Developer: Apple
- Release: 1993; 33 years ago (as Notator Logic)
- Stable release: 13.0 / November 5, 2026; 12 days ago
- Written in: C++
- Operating system: macOS (15.4 and later) iPadOS (26.0 or newer)
- Platform: x86-64 (as of Logic Pro 9.1) ARM64 (as of Logic Pro 10.6)
- Type: MIDI sequencer and digital audio workstation
- License: Proprietary
- Website: apple.com/logic-pro

Logic Pro is a proprietary digital audio workstation (DAW) and MIDI sequencer software application for the macOS platform developed by Apple. It was originally created in the early 1990s as Notator Logic, or Logic, by German software developer C-Lab which later went by Emagic. Apple acquired Emagic in 2002 and rebranded Logic to Logic Pro, adding it to their list of pro apps. In 2026, the software was included as part of the Apple Creator Studio suite of applications, though it remains available as a one-time purchase. It was the second most popular DAW – after Ableton Live – according to a survey conducted in 2015.

A consumer-level version based on the same interface and audio engine but with reduced features called Logic Express was available starting in 2004.

Apple's GarageBand comes free with all new Macintosh computers and iOS devices and is another application built on Logic's audio engine, and projects created in GarageBand can be opened and edited further in Logic Pro with no additional steps required. On December 8, 2011, the boxed version of Logic Pro was discontinued, along with Logic Express, and as with all other Apple software for Macs, Logic Pro is now only available through the Mac App Store and the iPad App Store, or with a discounted Pro Apps for Education Bundle for students through the Apple Store online. In May 2023, Logic Pro for iPad was introduced and has been available since May 23.

== Features ==
Logic Pro provides software instruments, audio effects and recording facilities for music synthesis. It also supports Apple Loops – royalty-free, professionally recorded instrument loops. Logic Pro and Express once shared many functions and the same interface. Logic Express was limited to two-channel stereo mixdown, while Logic Pro can handle multichannel surround sound. Logic Express only handled up to 255 audio tracks, depending on system performance (CPU and hard disk throughput and seek time), while, as of version 10.4.5, Logic Pro can handle up to 1,000.

Logic Pro can work with MIDI keyboards and control surfaces for input and processing, and for MIDI output. It features real-time scoring in musical notation, supporting guitar tablature, chord abbreviations and drum notation. Advanced MIDI editing is possible through Logic Pro's MIDI Transform Window, where velocity, pitch, pitch-bends, note length, humanize, and precise note positioning can be edited.

=== Software instruments ===
The software instruments included in Logic Pro X include: Drum Kit Designer, Drum Machine Designer, ES, ES2, EFM1, ES E, ES M, ES P, EVOC 20 PolySynth, Sampler (formerly EXS24), Quick Sampler, Step Sequencer, Klopfgeist, Retro Synth, Sculpture, Studio Bass, Studio Piano, Ultrabeat, Vintage B3, Vintage Clav, Vintage Electric Piano. These instruments produce sound in various ways, through subtractive synthesis (ES, ES2, ES E, ES M, ES P, Retro Synth), frequency modulation synthesis (EFM1), wavetable synthesis (ES2, Retro Synth), vocoding (EVOC 20 PolySynth), sampling (Sample Alchemy, Sampler, Quick Sampler, Drum Kit Designer), and component modeling techniques (Drum Machine Designer, Ultrabeat, Vintage B3, Vintage Clav, and Vintage Electric Piano, Sculpture). As of version 10.2, Logic Pro X also includes Alchemy, a sample-manipulation synthesizer that was previously developed by Camel Audio. The software instruments are activated by MIDI information that can be input via a MIDI instrument or drawn into the MIDI editor.

=== Audio effects ===
The Space Designer plugin attempts to emulate the characteristic echo and reverberation of a physical environment, using a method called convolution.

Audio effects include amp and guitar pedal emulators, delay effects, distortion effects, dynamics processors, equalization filters, filter effects, imaging processors, metering tools, modulation effects, pitch effects, and reverb effects. Among Logic's reverb plugins is Space Designer, which uses convolution reverb to simulate the acoustics of audio played in different environments, such as rooms of varying size, or emulate the echoes that might be heard on high mountains. Even so, Apple still includes legacy Logic effects such as PlatinumVerb which uses algorithms for producing reverb effects instead of convolution processing, which is more cpu-intensive. Apple has added the ability to mix in surround sound as well as in spatial audio. An important tool for these as well as stereo mixing are their binaural post-processing controls. To help users with these processes, they have added a Mastering Assistant.

=== Distributed processing ===
The application features distributed processing abilities (in 32-bit mode), which can function across an Ethernet LAN. One machine runs the Logic Pro app, while the other machines on the network run the Logic node app. Logic will then offload the effects and synth processing to the other machines on the network. If the network is fast enough (i.e., on the order of gigabit Ethernet), this can work in near real-time, depending on buffer settings and CPU loads. This allows users to combine the power of several Macintosh computers to process Logic Pro's built-in software instruments and plug-ins, and third party processing plug-ins. As of version 10.0.7, Logic can access 24 processing threads, which aligns with the capabilities of Apple's flagship 12-core Mac Pro.

== History ==
=== Creator and Notator ===
In 1987, C-Lab released Gerhard Lengeling's MIDI sequencer program for the Atari ST platform called Creator. From version 2.0 onwards, released in 1988, a version with added musical notation capabilities was also available, called Notator, made with the help of Chris Adam. A later bundled multitasking utility called Soft Link rebranded the packages as Creator SL and Notator SL.

In the United States, its main rivals at the time included Performer and Vision, whereas in Europe its main rivals were Steinberg's Pro 24 and later Cubase. Most MIDI sequencers presented a song as a linear set of tracks. However, Notator and Vision were pattern-based sequencers: songs were built by recording patterns (which might represent for example Intro, Verse, Chorus, Middle-8, Outro) with up to 16 tracks each, then assembling an Arrangement of these patterns, with up to 4 patterns playing simultaneously at any one time in the song. This more closely resembled working principles of hardware sequencers of the 1970s and 1980s.

When it was released, Notator was widely regarded by both musicians and the music press as one of the most powerful and intuitive sequencing and notation programs available on any platform. After the later introduction of competitor Steinberg's Cubase, however, track-based sequencing prevailed over pattern-based, resulting in the eventual greater integration and hybridization of the two methods in later versions of both Cubase and Logic. As Phil Hartnoll of Orbital said about a later version of Creator, "Cubase is much better for arranging: you can get an overall picture so much easier. They tried, with C-LAB, with that block arrangement, but I do like to be able to see an overview."

Notable users of Creator included Coldcut, Fatboy Slim, The Future Sound of London, LFO, Clint Mansell, Nightmares on Wax, The Orb, Orbital, and System 7.

=== Logic ===
The C-Lab programmers left that company to form Emagic, and in 1993 released a new program, Notator Logic, which attempted to fuse both track- and pattern-based operation (but looked much more like track-based sequencers than Notator). While rich in features, early versions of Logic on the Atari lacked the intuitiveness and immediacy of either Cubase or Notator, and never achieved the same success. However, by this time the Atari was becoming obsolete, and part of the reason why Notator Logic had been written from scratch with an object oriented GUI (though it shared the same nomenclature as its predecessor) was to make it easier to port to other platforms. The Notator prefix was dropped from the product name and the software became known as simply Logic.

As later versions of the software became available for Mac OS and Windows platforms, and acquired ever more sophisticated functions (especially in audio processing) to take advantage of increased computing power, Logic, together with the rise of the PC, gained popularity again.

Apple acquired Emagic in July 2002. The announcement included the news that development of the Windows version would no longer continue. This announcement caused controversy in the recording industry with an estimated 70,000 users having invested in the Windows route not wishing to reinvest in a complete new system. Despite much speculation in various Pro Audio forums however, exactly how many users may have abandoned Logic upon its acquisition by Apple, or abandoned the Windows platform for the Mac version, remains unknown, but Apple Pro Apps revenue has steadily increased since Apple's acquisition of Emagic, (roughly $2 billion a year as of Q1 2014).

=== Logic Express ===
Logic Express was a "light" version of Logic Pro. The first version, Logic Express 6, was announced on January 15, 2004, for release in March 2004. Logic Pro and Express share most functionality and the same interface. Logic Express was limited to two-channel stereo mixdown, while Logic Pro can handle multichannel surround sound; Logic Express also lacked support for TDM/DAE systems, high-end control surfaces and Distributed Audio Processing. Both could handle up to 255 audio tracks, depending on system performance (CPU, hard disk throughput and seek time).

Logic Express 7 was released alongside Logic Pro 7 on September 29, 2004.

Logic Express 8 came with 36 software instruments and 73 effect plug-ins, including almost all of those in the Logic Pro Package. Those that it didn't include are Sculpture, a physical modelling synthesiser; the "vintage" instruments (the EVB3 tonewheel organ, the EVD6 Clavinet and the EVP88 Electric Piano), however a cut-down version of these are included with the GarageBand instruments; Space designer, a convolution reverb effect; and delay designer, an advanced delay effect.

Logic Express was discontinued in 2011, when Logic Pro moved to the Mac App Store for $199.99.

== Versions ==
=== Early versions ===
Logic 5 featured significant improvements in user interface, and increased compatibility with more types of computers, operating systems, and a wide range of audio interfaces. Logic 5.5.1 was the last version to be released for Windows. From Logic 6 onwards, the software would only be exclusively available on Mac OS.

With Logic 6, Emagic added the availability of separately packaged software products that were closely integrated add-ons developed specifically for use with Logic, including software instruments, the EXS sampler and audio processing plug-ins. The Logic 6 package also included the stand-alone program Waveburner, for burning redbook audio CD standard-compliant CDR masters for replication, however, that application was considered a free bonus feature; it was not advertised as part of the package and did not include printed documentation. PDF documentation was included on the installer disc.

In March 2004, Apple released Logic Pro 6, which consolidated over 20 different Emagic products, including all instrument and effect plug-ins, Waveburner Pro (CD Authoring application), and Pro Tools TDM support, into a single product package. Apple also released a scaled down version of Logic called Logic Express, replacing two previous versions that filled that position called Logic Silver and Logic Gold. Apple began promoting Logic Pro as one of its flagship software 'Pro' applications for the Macintosh platform.

=== Logic Pro 7 ===
Logic Pro 7 was released September 29, 2004. Most notably, Apple modified the interface of Logic 7 to look more like a product that was developed by Apple.

Additions to Logic Pro 7 included: the integration of Apple Loops, Distributed Audio Processing (a technology for combining the power of multiple computers on a network), three new instruments including Sculpture (a sound modeling synth) and Ultrabeat (a drum synth and sequencer), and nine new effect plug-ins including Guitar Amp Pro (guitar amp simulator), and a linear phase corrected version of their six channel parametric equalizer. In total, Logic Pro 7 now included 70 effect plug-ins and 34 instrument plug-ins.

Pro-Tools TDM compatibility, which had been a feature of Logic since version 3.5, was not supported by Logic 7.2 on Intel-based Mac computers; TDM support returned with the release of Logic 8.

=== Logic Pro 8 ===
On September 12, 2007, Apple released the Logic Studio suite that included Logic Pro 8. Logic Pro was no longer a separate product, although a limited version Logic Express 8 was released on the same day, and remained a separate product.

Significant changes were made for Logic 8. Logic Pro 8 was now mainly Cocoa code, but still included some Carbon Libraries. Alongside changes such as the new processing plug-in (Delay Designer), Apple included features such as Quick Swipe Comping, similar to Soundtrack Pro 2, and multi-take management.

Apple also made changes to ease of use. These include the discontinuation of the XSKey dongle, and a streamlined interface. Each plug-in used in the channel strip opens in a new window when double-clicked. Many of the features found in Logic 7 have been consolidated into one screen. Other additions to the new interface included consolidated arrange windows, dual channel strips, built in browsers (like that in GarageBand) and production templates.

=== Logic Pro 9 ===
On July 23, 2009, Logic Pro 9 was announced. A major new feature included "Flex Time", Apple's take on "elastic" audio, which allows audio to be quantized. A version of the pedalboard from GarageBand was included, together with a new virtual guitar amplifier where the modeled components could be combined in different ways. There were also a number of improvements to audio editing, fulfilled user requests such as "bounce in place" and selective track and channel strip import, as well as an expanded content library including one more Jam Pack. Some of the bundled software, including MainStage 2 and Soundtrack Pro 3, was also improved. Logic Pro 9 is Universal Binary, although not officially supported for use on PowerPC computers. SoundDiver, which had been quietly bundled with previous versions, was dropped, eliminating support for arguably the world's most popular synthesizer editor/librarian. As Apple has bundled so many software instruments with Logic, it is not likely that we'll see the return of integration with external synthesizer hardware to the Logic platform.

On January 12, 2010, Apple released Logic Pro 9.1, an Intel only release, thereby officially discontinuing Logic for the PowerPC platform. Logic Pro 9.1 had the option of running in 64-bit mode, which allowed the application to address more memory than in the past. Says Apple "With 64-bit mode, the application memory is not limited to 4GB as with 32-bit applications, so there is essentially no practical limit by today's standards." Third party plug-ins that are 32-bit were still compatible, but would run from a 'wrapper' inside Logic Pro itself.

On December 9, 2011, Apple announced that Logic Pro Studio 9 would no longer be available on DVD, and would only be sold via the Mac App Store. The price was reduced from $499 to $199.99 for the Logic Pro app, and $29.99 for MainStage. The download was just over 400MB, and 19GB of optional loops were available as in-app downloads.

This version of Logic Pro Studio 9 no longer allowed users to access any microtunings in Scala format other than those provided with the software by Apple.

=== Logic Pro X ===
Released as successor to Logic Pro 9 on July 16, 2013, Logic Pro X (10.0.0) included a new, single-window customizable interface, with a design in line with Final Cut Pro X, as well as new features. New tools in this release are Drummer, a virtual session player that automatically plays along with your song in a wide variety of drumming styles and techniques, and Flex Pitch, a Flex Time equivalent for pitch editing in audio recordings. Also, a new "Smart Controls" feature allows users to map parameters from an array of plugins to a single, convenient control interface. Redesigned keyboards and synths were included, together with new stomp boxes, bass amp and drum kit designers, and a chord arpeggiator. A completely rebuilt sound and loop library was introduced, along with a new Patch architecture. Logic Pro X also improved track organization by allowing users to group multiple tracks into 'folder' like categories (e.g., acoustics, synthesizers, vocals, percussion, etc.). In addition to this organization, Logic Pro X allowed individuals to trigger 'solo,' 'mute,' and 'volume' controls for each group. Further improvements were made to score editing, exporting (now compatible with MusicXML format), and this version introduced MIDI plug-in compatibility. Coinciding with the release of Logic Pro X was the release of a companion iPad app called Logic Remote, which allows wireless control of Logic Pro X, including Touch Instruments for playing and recording software instruments as well as tools for navigating, making basic edits and mixing.

Since this release, Logic Pro X runs in 64-bit mode only and no longer works with 32-bit plug-ins. Logic Pro X is capable of transferring most data from previous projects saved in Logic Pro 5 and later, though the transfer to 64-bit only means older 32-bit plugins will no longer work.

As new Sound Packs and Producer Packs have been added to GarageBand's Sound Library, they have subsequently been made available to download in Logic Pro.

Logic 10.4 introduced a new reverb called ChromaVerb, and new functionality such as Smart Tempo, as well as the option to undo mixer actions. In addition, version 10.4 introduced support for version 2 of the ARA (Audio Random Access) standard. 10.5 was released in May 2020. It features Live Loops, Sampler, Quick Sampler, Remix FX, new drag-and-drop workflows, Drum Synth, and Step Sequencer. Sampler and Quick Sampler replaced the EXS24 as Logic Pro X's flagship sampling plugin. 10.5 also came with a demo project for Billie Eilish's hit song "Ocean Eyes" available for all Logic Pro X users to download.

=== Logic Pro ===
In November 2020, Logic Pro X was renamed "Logic Pro", coinciding with the release of macOS 11 Big Sur.

In October 2021, Apple released Logic Pro 10.7 coinciding with the release of Apple's new M1 Pro and M1 Max chips for its latest MacBook Pro 2021 lineup. Logic Pro 10.7 supports audio production mixing in Dolby Atmos and surround sound format. This version also included two more demo projects. These were two versions of the original multitrack project of Lil Nas X's "Montero (Call Me by Your Name)", one version in stereo and another in Dolby Atmos.

In May 2024, Apple announced and released Logic Pro 11, the first full-number update since 2013. With a heavy emphasis on machine-learning tools, this release introduced Session Players, which took the success of the previously introduced Drummer feature further with a virtual bassist and keyboardist. Also introduced were Stem Splitter and ChromaGlow, two new AI-powered plugins for mixing and mastering. Stem Splitter analyses an audio file into its component instrumental parts, e.g. voice, guitar, bass, drums. ChromaGlow emulates the warmth and timbre of analogue circuitry.

Logic Pro became available on iPad beginning in 2023. Unlike the version for Mac, the iPad version of Logic Pro has only been made available as a subscription. Both versions of Logic Pro were included in the Apple Creator Studio subscription suite beginning in 2026. While the standalone one-time purchase for the Mac version remains available, the standalone subscription for the iPad version has since been discontinued.

== See also ==
- MainStage – a companion app to Logic Pro for live performances
- GarageBand – Apple's consumer digital audio workstation
- Core Audio – the low-level system sound API that Logic Pro relies on, built-into Apple's operating systems
- Audio Units – Apple's plugin architecture for Logic Pro
- Logic Studio – a discontinued software suite which included Logic Pro and other Apple audio-editing apps
- Logic Control – a discontinued control surface for Logic dating back to its Emagic days
- Comparison of digital audio editors
