= Final Cut Pro =

Video editing software by Apple

- Logos for the one-time purchase version (left) and Apple Creator Studio version (right)

- A 2018 screenshot of Final Cut Pro
- Original author: Macromedia
- Developer: Apple
- Release: April 1999; 27 years ago
- Stable release: 13.0 / November 18, 2026; 1 day ago
- Operating system: macOS (26.6 and later) iPadOS (26.6 or newer)
- Type: Video editing software
- License: Proprietary
- Website: apple.com/final-cut-pro

Final Cut Pro (Note: On Apple Creator Studio, it's Final Cut Pro: Create Video.) (often abbreviated FCP or FCPX) is a professional non-linear video-editing application initially developed by Macromedia, and, since 1998, by Apple as part of its pro apps and Creator Studio collection for macOS and iPadOS. Final Cut Pro allows users to import, edit, and process video footage, and output it to a wide variety of formats.

In the 2000s, Final Cut Pro developed a large and expanding user base, mainly video hobbyists and independent filmmakers. It also made inroads with film and television editors who have traditionally used Avid Media Composer. According to a 2007 SCRI study, Final Cut Pro made up 49% of the United States professional editing market, with Avid at 22%. A published survey in 2008 by the American Cinema Editors Guild placed their users at 21% Final Cut Pro (and growing from previous surveys of this group), while all others were on an Avid system of some kind. In 2011, Final Cut Pro 7 was replaced with the fully rewritten Final Cut Pro X, which initially lacked many features from previous versions, though frequent updates have brought back many of these features. Final Cut Pro for iPad was made available on May 23, 2023. Final Cut Pro is available as part of the Apple Creator Studio subscription suite for macOS and iPadOS, and as a standalone purchase for macOS.

== Features ==
Final Cut Pro provides non-linear, non-destructive editing of any QuickTime-compatible video format including DV, HDV, P2 MXF (DVCProHD), XDCAM (via plug-in), 2K, 4K, 5K, and 8K film formats and can import projects directly from iMovie for iOS and iPadOS. It supports a number of simultaneously composited video tracks (limited mainly by video form capability); unlimited audio tracks; multi-camera editing for combining video from multiple camera sources (referred to as angles); 360º video editing support; as well as the standard ripple, roll, slip, slide, scrub, razor blade and time remapping edit functions. It comes with a range of video transitions and a range of video and audio filters such as keying tools, mattes and vocal de-poppers and de-essers. It also has multiple color-correction tools including color wheels, sliders and curves, video scopes and a selection of generators, such as slugs, test cards, and noise.

The functionality of Final Cut Pro can be extended with plug-ins which may provide additional effects, titles, transitions, and more. Apple maintains the APIs and documentation for everyone to develop such plug-ins.

=== Interface ===
- Event browser: Replacing “bins” in other NLEs, the event browser is where the original media is found and can be searched and sorted by various forms of metadata. Keyword ranges, favorite and rejected ranges, and smart collections allow for faster sorting of a large number of clips.
- Magnetic timeline: Inventing an alternative to track-based timelines found in traditional NLEs, Final Cut's magnetic timeline uses clip connections to keep connected clips and secondary storylines in sync with clips located on the primary storyline. By default, clips move around each other "magnetically", filling in any gaps and avoiding clip collisions by automatically bumping clips out of the way vertically. The magnetic connections are also user-definable.
- Roles: In order to separate and organize different audio types on the magnetic timeline, editors can designate what "role' each clip plays. Introduced in version 10.0.1, Roles can be assigned to clips as an alternate way of creating organizational functionality. A Role (or Sub-Role) gets assigned to clips to identify what it is (for example Video, Titles, Dialogue, Effects, Music). Upon Sharing a Master File of the Project the various Roles can be split out as stems or in a multitrack file for broadcast delivery or other distribution needs.
- Content auto-analysis: Found in the import window and event browser is the option to analyze media for shot type and facial recognition or fix potential problems like audio loudness, audio hum, channel grouping, background noise, color balance, pulldown removal, and stabilization. This process generates metadata that can automatically be organized as Keywords and can be grouped into Smart Collections.
- Synchronized clips: Video and audio clips recorded on separate devices can be synched automatically by timecode, audio waveforms, and markers together as a single clip.
- Compound clips: Nested sequences from the original Final Cut Pro have been replaced by compound clips. A selection of video and audio clips can be nested into a single compound clip. This compound clip can be opened in its own timeline or broken apart for further editing. It can also be reused in different projects.
- Closed captions: Introduced in version 10.4.1, closed captions can be created right in the timeline or imported into the timeline from an external file.
- Multicam editing: Introduced in version 10.0.3, multiple camera angles can be synchronized automatically and combined into a multicam clip. Once in the timeline, a multicam clip can be cut up into different angles by using the angle viewer. A multicam clip can be opened in the angle editor where new angles can be added, synched, relabeled, and rearranged at any time.
- Auditions: Clips can be grouped together in the event browser or on the timeline as auditions. Once in the timeline, an audition allows the user to choose between different clips in their edit while the timeline ripples automatically in order to preview two or more different versions of a cut.
- 3D titles: Introduced in version 10.2.0, text can be extruded, textured, lit, and shaded with materials and environments in 3D. This allows users to create titles like those found in Hollywood movies directly in the application.
- 360 degree video editing: Introduced in version 10.4. import and edit 360° equirectangular video in a wide range of formats and frame sizes.
- Advanced color grading
- Wide-gamut high dynamic range

=== Technical features ===
While inheriting the name from its predecessor, Final Cut Pro, Final Cut Pro X is a completely re-written application. As a native 64-bit application it takes advantage of more than 4GB of RAM. It utilizes all CPU cores with Grand Central Dispatch. Open CL support allows GPU accelerated processing for improved performance for playback, rendering, and transcoding. It is resolution-independent, supporting images sizes from SD to beyond 4K. Final Cut Pro X supports playback of many native camera and audio formats. It can also transcode video clips to the Apple ProRes codec for improved performance. Many tasks are performed in the background such as auto-saving, rendering, transcoding, and media management, allowing the user an uninterrupted experience. Final Cut Pro X was developed for macOS only.

Motion 5
Titles, motion graphics, effects generated in Motion 5 can be published to Final Cut Pro X. Inside the Final Cut Pro X, editors can modify the parameters and contents of the effects, as long as the permission for such modifications is turned on in the Motion 5 project file.

Adobe Photoshop
In Final Cut Pro X 10.0.3 and later, the editor can import Photoshop projects onto the storyline similar to a still image. A Photoshop project with layers is treated similar to a compound clip and the layers are preserved after being imported into the Final Cut Pro X. Individual layers of the Photoshop project can be toggled on or off inside the Final Cut Pro X by double-clicking the imported project and going into the compound clip editing panel. Other adjustments to the Photoshop project should be performed on the imported Photoshop project using Adobe Photoshop program with updates happening in real-time inside Final Cut Pro X.

== Ecosystem ==
Before version 10, Final Cut Pro could be extended using the FXScript scripting language.

Since its release, Final Cut Pro X has supported the construction of effect, transition, and title plugins by publishing custom-built effects from Apple Motion. This has led to a third-party ecosystem of developers building effects from simple color corrections to complex templates. Third-party plug-ins can also be created through Apple's FxPlug API, the successor of FXScript. As Projects, Events, and Libraries are stored in a database format; this has allowed many third-party developers to build workflow tools by utilizing FCPXML.

== History ==
=== Creation ===
Randy Ubillos led the team that developed the first three versions of Adobe Premiere. His group was then hired by Macromedia to develop KeyGrip, a more professional video editing program based on Apple's QuickTime, for Macromedia. Niya C Sisk was retained by Macromedia to create the UI of KeyGrip in partnership with the engineering team. However, Macromedia was unable to release the product, since they had licensed a component from Truevision, and the latter had a licensing agreement with Microsoft that prohibited the component's use in conjunction with QuickTime. As a result, and due to Macromedia's decision to focus on the web market, it sold its desktop applications, including KeyGrip.

In 1998, KeyGrip was renamed Final Cut, and was demonstrated as a 0.9 alpha in a private room at the NAB Show. The demonstration showed both Mac and Windows versions of the software, with the Mac version using a Truevision RTX dual-stream real-time card with limited real-time effects. When no buyer was found for the program, Apple acquired the development team as a defensive measure. As Apple was unable to find a buyer for Final Cut, it continued development work, adding FireWire support and releasing the program as Final Cut Pro at NAB 1999.

=== Early versions ===
To ensure that Final Cut Pro had strong support for third-party self-paced and instructor-led training from the start, Apple partnered with DVcreators.net to release a training disc called "Final Cut Pro PowerStart" at the NAB show on the day of Final Cut Pro's release. Apple also worked with DVcreators.net to host hundreds of free and paid Final Cut Pro seminars and workshops in 60 cities around the world in the following years, a strategy that some credit with significantly contributing to Final Cut Pro's early market awareness and success.

After the release of Final Cut Pro, Adobe Premiere maintained a strong market share on Windows, but began to decline on Mac as its older codebase was more difficult to maintain. In 2003, Apple launched a trade-in program that allowed Premiere users to exchange their discs for a free copy of Final Cut Express or receive a $500 discount on Final Cut Pro.

One of the factors that contributed to the success of Final Cut Pro was the relative maturity of QuickTime and its native support for new DV cameras connected via FireWire. The first fully broadcast quality, globally distributed TV show produced using Final Cut Pro was Women of Wrestling in 2000, which used the Pinnacle CinéWave uncompressed video card. The Oxygen Network also used the software to produce shows such as SheCommerce during its network launch in early 2000.

In late 2001, independent producer Michael A. Bloom credited Final Cut Pro as being crucial to the production of his controversial film PlayCouples, A New Era of Swinging (2003). In an interview with Larry King, Bloom claimed that the relatively new platform did not fail once while rendering the film, unlike his experiences with Avid Media Composer. Bloom had been an advocate for Final Cut Pro since using it for beta testing under an agreement between his production company and The Oxygen Network. The studio motion picture The Rules of Attraction was also edited using beta versions of Final Cut Pro 3, demonstrating that successful 3:2 pulldown matchback to 24fps was possible with an easy-to-use software product. The film's director, Roger Avary, became a spokesperson for Final Cut Pro, appearing in print advertisements worldwide. His endorsement of the product helped to give mainstream editors like Walter Murch confidence in its readiness for professional use. In August 2002, Final Cut Pro received a Primetime Emmy Engineering Award for its impact on the television industry.

=== Final Cut Pro 4 to 7 ===
Final Cut Pro 4 was released in April 2002, and included three new applications: Compressor for transcoding between video formats, LiveType for advanced titling (such as the creation of animated lower thirds), and Soundtrack for creating royalty-free music soundtracks. It also included Cinema Tools, which had previously been sold separately for filmmakers working with telecine.

In April 2004, Final Cut Pro 4.5 was released and branded as "Final Cut Pro HD" due to its native support for Panasonic's tape-based DVCPRO HD format for compressed 720p and 1080i HD over FireWire. (While the software had been capable of uncompressed HD editing since version 3.0, it required expensive video cards and high-speed storage at the time.)

Final Cut Pro 5 was announced at a pre-NAB event in April 2005 and shipped in May of that year. It added support for the HDV format for compressed HD, which had previously been supported in Final Cut Pro's scaled-down cousin, Final Cut Express. Final Cut Pro 5 also added support for Panasonic's P2 format, which allowed for the recording of DVCPRO HD video to memory cards rather than tape.

In January 2006, Apple stopped selling Final Cut Pro as a standalone product and began offering it only as part of the Final Cut Studio bundle. In March 2006, a universal binary 5.1 version of Final Cut Pro was released as part of Final Cut Studio, and upgrades were made available by sending the original installation discs back to Apple with a fee. One notable difference in the Intel versions of Final Cut and Motion was that they no longer recognized After Effects plugins, but instead supported Apple's own universal plugin architecture, FxPlug.

On April 15, 2007, Apple unveiled Final Cut Pro 6 as the centerpiece of the Final Cut Studio 2 bundle. Despite not having a booth at NAB 2009, the product was widely represented on the show floor by various vendors, including the Red Digital Cinema team, which relied heavily on Final Cut Pro during development.

On July 23, 2009, Final Cut Pro 7 (also referred to informally by users as Final Cut Studio 3) was released, though it remained a 32-bit application.

=== Final Cut Pro X ===
Final Cut Pro X was unveiled on April 12, 2011 at the NAB Show, and released to the Mac App Store on June 21, 2011 along with new versions of Motion and Compressor. Final Cut Pro X was fully-rewritten in 64-bit, with a new interface, workflow enhancements and improved automation, and new features such as ColorSync integration, a resolution-independent playback system, and Core Animation-based system scaling. As part of the release, Final Cut Studio was discontinued, along with Color, Soundtrack Pro, and DVD Studio Pro.

The reaction was extremely mixed, with veteran film editor Walter Murch initially refusing to use it, citing a lack of features compared to Final Cut Pro 7. Support for translating timelines from Final Cut Pro 7 to Final Cut Pro X was notably missing, requiring editors to preserve a copy of Final Cut Pro 7 to edit older projects. An online petition asking Apple to continue development of Final Cut Pro 7 or to sell it to a third-party gathered 1,600 signatures within a week. Some of the missing features in Final Cut Pro X that were essential for professional video production included the lack of an edit decision list (EDL), XML and Open Media Framework Interchange (OMF) support, the inability to import projects created in previous versions of Final Cut Pro, the absence of a multicam editing tool, missing support for third-party I/O hardware output, and videotape capture being limited to FireWire video devices, including capture with third-party hardware. These missing features were addressed within the first six months of the product's life. EDL export, a product of the early days of videotape editing, is now supported through third-party software and creating an AAF (a newer version of OMF) for passing projects to Pro Tools through X2Pro. In a 2015 interview, Murch was much less critical of the tool and suggested that he was interested in using it. Other movie producers, have agreed that Final Cut Pro X's initial shortcomings have been fixed.

One of the notable changes introduced in Final Cut Pro X was the Magnetic Timeline, which replaced the track-based timeline of previous versions. This initially caused issues with exporting audio stems for broadcast and distribution, but this was addressed with the release of version 10.0.1, which introduced Video and Audio Roles, allowing users to export multitrack QuickTime files or stems. Files can be exported as AFF using a third-party app called X2Pro or through Logic Pro X.

With version 10.0.6 released on October 23, 2012, Apple added native support for Redcode Raw and MXF through a third party plugin. Prior to the introduction of version 10.1, Project and Event Libraries were separate folders. Events contained all the original media and Project Libraries contained the actual edited Projects on timelines. The Project and Event Libraries were stored in a user's Movie folder or on the root level of an external hard drive. These Libraries automatically opened in Final Cut Pro X depending on which hard drives were mounted. That all changed on December 19, 2013, when Project and Event Libraries were merged into a new Library model. Libraries contained Events which in turn contained Projects. And unlike before Libraries could be opened and closed by the user. Media could be stored internally in the Library or kept outside the Library. Media management was further refined in version 10.1.2, released on June 27, 2014. MXF import, edit, and export became natively supported with version 10.1.4.

Version 10.2, released during the NAB Show 2015, introduced 3D Titles in both Final Cut Pro X and Motion. The Color Board was merged with a new Color Correction effect to allow for more flexibility in stacking layers of effects, and Apple added the ability to apply Keying or Shape Masks to any effect. Version 10.3 introduced a redesigned interface with Magnetic Timeline 2, support for iXML metadata when importing audio, significantly improved audio editing, support for wide-gamut color and REC 2020 color import, edit, and export, and support for MXF-wrapped Apple ProRes.

Version 10.4 introduced color wheels and color curves, 360º video editing, and high-dynamic-range (HDR) video, and the HEVC and HEIF formats. In April 2018, Apple said that there were more than 2.5 million users of Final Cut Pro X. In version 10.4.1, released during the NAB Show 2018, closed captioning was added, along with support for ProRes RAW. In November 2020, in tandem with the release of macOS Big Sur, the X was dropped from the name, and the product became again known as Final Cut Pro.

== Release history ==
Version	Date	Significant changes
10.0.0	June 21, 2011	All new application with redesigned GUI; 64-bit support; An advanced searchable database called the event browser that uses keyword ranges and smart collections for clip sorting; New magnetic timeline that abandoned traditional track-based NLE paradigms; Live skimmer; Filmstrip thumbnail view; Advanced metadata views in clip info inspector; New color-board interface for color correction; ColorSync with the AV Foundation for accurate color monitoring; Requires Mac OS X Snow Leopard 10.6 or later
10.0.1	September 9, 2011	Audio roles for audio and video stem exports; XML import and export; Xsan support; Custom start timecode for projects
10.0.2	November 16, 2011	Bug fixes
10.0.3	January 31, 2012	Multicam clips, automatic sync, mixed formats and frame rates, up to 64 angles, and new angle editor interface; Media relinking; Layered Photoshop documents support; Beta broadcast monitor support; XML 1.1
10.0.4	April 10, 2012	Performance enhancements
10.0.5	June 11, 2012	Bug fixes
10.0.6	October 23, 2012	Multichannel audio editing in the timeline; Unified import window. export selected ranges; Native Redcode raw support; MFX support through third-party plugin; Dual viewers with scopes; Chapter markers for video file, DVD, and Blu-ray disc exports; Range selections preserved with clips in the event browser; Paste attributes option for choosing specific effects to copy between clips; Drop shadow effect; Compound clips saved in the timeline save in the event browser to be reused in other projects; XML 1.2; Blade all command
10.0.7	December 6, 2012	Bug fixes
10.0.8	March 26, 2013	Sony XAVC codec support; Arri Alexa Log C to Rec 709 LUT
10.0.9	July 30, 2013	Bug fixes
10.1.0	December 19, 2013	Event and project libraries now merged into new library model; Support for dual GPUs in Mac Pro; New 4K title, transition, and generators content; External or internal media management options for libraries; Project snapshots for versioning; custom project frame sizes; Native support for .MTS and .MT2S AVCHD files; Used media indicators; API for third parties to create custom share options; 4K video sharing to YouTube; XML 1.3; Performance enhancements; Requires OS X Mavericks 10.9 or later
10.1.1	January 16, 2014	Bug fixes and performance enhancements
10.1.2	June 27, 2014	Improved media management for libraries; Used media ranges apply to compound, multicam, and synched clips; Apply LUT corrections to view log footage from Arri, Blackmagic, Canon and Sony Cameras in Rec. 709 colorspace; XML library export; Automatically create keywords on import from Finder tags; 4K video sharing to Vimeo; XML 1.4
10.1.3	August 19, 2014	Bug fixes
10.1.4	November 25, 2014	Native support for MXF; Panasonic AVC-LongG codec support
10.2.0	April 13, 2015	3D Titles; Simultaneously display up to four video scopes; Keying and shape masks can be applied to any effect; Color board now merged with new color correction effect; Support for Panasonic AVC-Ultra, Sony XAVC S, JVC Long GOP codecs; GPU-accelerated RED raw processing; Smart collections at the library level; XML 1.5; Requires OS X Yosemite 10.10.2 or later
10.2.1	May 14, 2015	Bug fixes
10.2.2	September 4, 2015	Sony XAVC-L, Canon XF-AVC 8-bit, and Panasonic AVC-Intra 4:4:4 codec support; Export interlaced H.264; Library backup on asset management systems
10.2.3	February 4, 2016	Customizable default effect; 4K export preset for Apple devices; Performance enhancement for SANs; Support for XF-AVC codecs; Sharing to multiple YouTube accounts; Will not run on macOS High Sierra 10.13 or newer.
10.3	October 27, 2016	Interface improvements; Magnetic timeline 2; Wide color gamut; Support for the touch bar on MacBook Pro; More video formats; XML 1.6; Requires OS X El Capitan 10.11.4 or later
10.3.4	March 25, 2017	Last supported version for OS X El Capitan
10.4	December 14, 2017	Import and Edit 360°/VR equirectangular video; Color correction redesign; Support for 8K projects and videos; HEVC support; HDR support; XML 1.7; Requires macOS Sierra 10.12.4 or later
10.4.1	April 15, 2018	Support for embedded closed captioning; Support for ProRes RAW; XML 1.8; Requires macOS High Sierra 10.13.2 or later
10.4.2	April 30, 2018	Bug fixes
10.4.3	June 21, 2018	Support for Pro-Res RAW files
10.4.4	November 15, 2018	Workflow extensions; Batch sharing; Video noise reduction; Timecode window; Comparison viewer; Tiny planet; Captions, timeline drag, comic-ization, new 360° transitions; Improvements to 360° video, audio, closed captions, color correction, effects, multicam, roles, timeline, titles
10.4.5	January 17, 2019	Bug fixes
10.4.6	March 21, 2019	Detects and offers the option to convert media files incompatible with future macOS versions – those after Mojave 10.14
10.4.7	October 7, 2019	New Metal-based processing engine for faster rendering, compositing and exporting.; Better multiple GPU compatibility; New color tools; View HDR content tone-mapped to look correct on SDR displays if running macOS Catalina; Requires macOS Mojave 10.14.6 or later
10.4.8	December 10, 2019	Bug fixes
10.4.9	August 25, 2020	Enhancements to proxy workflows; Automated tools for social media cropping; Editorial workflow improvements; XML 1.9
10.4.10	September 24, 2020	Bug fixes
10.5	November 12, 2020	Improved performance and efficiency on Mac computers with Apple silicon; Option to create a copy of your library and automatically transcode media to ProRes Proxy or H.264 at various resolutions; Requires macOS Catalina 10.15.6 or later
10.5.1	December 20, 2020	Option to share video to Youtube and Facebook
10.5.2	March 4, 2021	Adds support for a new Universal RED plugin enabling native RED raw decoding and playback on both Apple silicon and Intel-based Mac computers; Improves stability when playing back H.264 video files with corrupt data
10.5.3	June 17, 2021	Create and edit custom column views with the new column editor; Search for media in the browser using expanded criteria including clip names, markers, and notes; Sort clips in the browser according to type, including proxy, optimized, and missing media; Restores support for copying clips from the Finder and pasting into the timeline
10.5.4	July 8, 2021	Improves stability when exporting with certain macOS Language & Region preferences; Improves stability when playing H.264 or HEVC media; Last supported version for macOS Catalina
10.6	October 18, 2021	Drag effects, titles, or generators into the viewer to automatically detect, track, and match the movement of faces or objects using machine learning.; Manually add a tracker from the inspector, adjust its mask shape, and choose between different tracking analysis types.; Cinematic Mode; Edit videos recorded with iPhone 13 in Cinematic mode (requires macOS Monterey).; XML 1.10 inside a new .fcpxmld bundle format; Requires macOS Big Sur 11.5.1 or later
10.6.1	November 15, 2021	Stability and reliability improvements
10.6.2	April 12, 2022	Filtering of background noise in audio using machine learning (requires macOS Monterey 12.3 or later); iMovie iOS 3.0 import; Locate clips that appear more than once in a project
10.6.3	May 19, 2022	Improves reliability when using drag and drop to replace a transition.; Improves reliability when dragging a transition onto a connected clip.; Fixes an issue where custom sound effects don't always appear in the Sound Effects browser.
10.6.4	August 9, 2022	Fixes an issue where video frames may be out of order during playback or export
10.6.5	October 24, 2022	Supports faster exporting of H.264 or HEVC on Macs with Apple silicon.; Increases stability when disconnecting a Sidecar display on Intel Mac computers.; Improves performance when editing on a Mac with an ambient light sensor.; Fixes an issue where adding images from the Photos browser to a new project may cause additional media to be appended before the last clip.
10.6.6	May 23, 2023	Import projects from Final Cut Pro for iPad; Automatic color management for editing HDR and SDR clips in the same project, with intelligent tone mapping of video to match color space.; New collection of professionally designed titles, effects, transitions, and generators.; Improved color correction workflow with color Adjestments effects and new color presets.; Scene Removal Mask tool.
10.6.7	July 18, 2023	Addresses an issue where audio effects would not be reset during playback.; Fixes an issue where an Audio Units effect could have incorrect values when importing using FCPXML.; Improves waveform redrawing on expanded audio components when adjusting volume with the Touch Bar.; Resolves an issue where the Voice Isolation Amount slider would snap to 0% when trying to set a value less than 7%.; Improves reliability when retiming a clip with the Scene Removal Mask applied.; Fixes and issue where the Control Range setting in the Color Adjustments effect would be incorrectly set to SDR when importing using FCPXML; Last supported version for macOS Monterey
10.6.8	August 1, 2023	Fixes an issue where video could freeze in the viewer.
10.6.9	September 19, 2023	Adds support for log-encoded video shot on iPhone 15 Pro and iPhone 15 Pro Max.; Support for third-party log profiles for footage shot on popular cameras from Fujifilm, DJI, and ARRI.; Adds support for Cinematic video recorded with iPhone on iOS 17.
10.6.10	October 5, 2023	Fixes and issue that could cause an FxPlug-based title that analysed a clip to result in an incomplete analysis.; Fixes an issue that could cause a Motion templay with an applied Align To behavior to display an incorrect animation.
10.7	November 30, 2023	Automatically scroll on the timeline to keep your clips in view under the playhead during playback.; Increase editing efficiency by combining a selected group of connected clips into a connected storyline.; View both video- and audio-role colors to easily see the organization of the timeline at a glance.; See improved results when using the Object Tracker's all-new machine-learning model to analyse the movement of faces and other objects on Mac computers with Apple silicon.; Use the enhanced Reveal in Browser feature to easily locate a clip in the browser without losing your selected Keyword Collection or Smart Collection.; Export HEVC and H.264 files faster by simultaneously processing video segments across available media engines (requires macOS Sonoma or later and a Mac with Apple M1 Max, M1 Ultra, M2 Max, M2 Ultra or M3 Max).; Fixes an issue that caused an offline media badge to remain on an event after reconnecting.; Fixes an issue that could cause video to be cropped in the multicam angle editor.; Improves performance when upgrading a library that contains many markers.
10.7.1	December 21, 2023	Improves stability on Intel-based Mac models when using color wheels or color curves on H.264 video clips.; Fixes an issue with some default keyboard shortcuts working incorrectly on non-English keyboards.
10.8	June 20, 2024	Automatically improve the color, color balance, contrast, and brightness of video or still images using the new Enhance Light and Color effect, powered by machine learning.; Enable Smooth Slo-Mo to create amazing slow-motion visuals with an AI-enhanced algorithm on Mac models with Apple silicon.; Stay organized by renaming color corrections and video effects in the inspector.; Drag effects right from the inspector to other clips in the timeline or viewer.; Use new filters in the timeline index to quickly identify clips with audio effects, video effects, retiming changes, missing media, or missing effects.; Search in the timeline index by reel, scene, camera angle, camera name, custom metadata, or effect name.; Search in the timeline index for user-created roles.; Search for clips in the browser using new “Starts With” and “Ends With” search criteria.; Enable or disable timeline scrolling using a new toolbar button.; Improves timeline scrolling behavior during reverse playback.; Fixes an issue where captions would sometimes flicker when timeline scrolling is enabled.; Fixes an issue where browser items would be appear to be renamed when naming a folder.; Fixes an issue that caused disabling the audio roles of a clip to make the video roles appear disabled.; Accurately tone-maps HDR video content in 360° view for 360° projects.; Fixes an issue that could cause ProRes RAW clips to be displayed incorrectly in the viewer on Intel-based Mac models.; Fixes an issue that caused a freeze frame from a log-encoded clip to appear too bright in an HLG timeline.; Fixes an issue that caused a disabled Color Board effect to be incorrectly enabled after exporting and reimporting an FCPXML of the timeline.; Fixes an issue that caused the Space Designer audio effect to show presets as missing.; Fixes an issue that could cause Final Cut Pro to stop responding when rendering with another app active.; Fixes an issue that caused switching between the angle viewer and the video scopes to change the angle viewer selection back to “Enable video and audio switching.”; Fixes an issue that caused Final Cut Pro to stop responding when both a folder and an enclosed item were selected in the browser.; Adds support for sharing 8K ProRes MXF files.; Improves support for Canon C2 AVC media.; Adds support for Canon XF-AVC 1920x1080 59.94i/50i H.264 25Mbps.; Removes support for disc burning.; Updates FCPXML to version 1.12.
10.8.1	August 13, 2024	Fixes an issue that prevented audio playback when stepping through timeline clips with the left and right arrow keys.; Fixes an issue that could cause some MTS files to play back without audio.; Fixes an issue that could cause Final Cut Pro to stop responding when three-finger gestures were used on a trackpad.
11.0	November 13, 2024	Expand your creative freedom with the revolutionary AI-powered Magnetic Mask, and isolate people, objects, and shapes in any footage without a green screen or time-consuming manual rotoscoping (a Mac with Apple silicon recommended).; Use Transcribe to Captions to automatically create captions from spoken audio in the timeline with a powerful AI language model built for speed and accuracy (Mac with Apple silicon and macOS Sequoia or later required).; Import and edit spatial video clips from Apple Vision Pro or iPhone 15 Pro or later; add titles, color correction, and effects; and share captivating spatial projects that can be viewed on Apple Vision Pro (Mac with Apple silicon required).; Edit in the timeline at 90, 100, and 120 fps.; Reduce clutter in the browser by automatically hiding original clips when creating synced clips or multicam clips.; Speed up your creative flow with new Picture in Picture and Callout effects.; Create interesting visual reveals with new Modular transitions.; Use Vertical Zoom to Fit to scale clip heights to fit in the timeline.; Change the order of vertically stacked clips with a new keyboard shortcut.; Quickly navigate clips in list view and edit clip text with a new keyboard shortcut.; Increase efficiency with additional new keyboard shortcuts including Rename Clip, Show/Hide Audio Lanes, Expand/Collapse Subroles, Play Half Speed Forward/Reverse, Consolidate Motion Content, Paste Timecode, and Show Horizon.; Install third-party Media Extensions to support playback and editing of more video formats (macOS Sequoia or later required).; Additional support and bug fixes: Improves performance in timelines that contain a high number of markers.; Fixes an issue that caused the alert badge on an event to not disappear after all missing media was relinked.; Fixes an issue that caused the Clouds generator to be partially transparent.; Fixes an issue that caused the Collapse to Connected Storyline command to trim audio if the audio was leading video.; Adds support for exporting uncompressed or ProRes MXF video with 32 kHz audio.; Adds support for exporting directly to the Photos library.; Updates FCPXML to version 1.13.
11.0.1	February 3, 2025	Addresses an issue that caused Custom Overlays to not be visible in the viewer.; Fixes an issue that caused errors when using Send to Compressor from a timeline that included Magnetic Mask effects.; Improves reliability of the Show Horizon command in the viewer.; Improves performance when pressing and holding the H key to scroll the timeline manually.
11.1	March 27, 2025	Add color corrections and effects to an adjustment clip above the timeline to apply them to a range of clips at once.; Get inspired with Image Playground and use Apple Intelligence to quickly create stylized images based on a description, suggested concepts, or people from your Photos library.*; Speed up your Magnetic Mask workflows with important bug fixes, performance improvements, and a new keyboard shortcut to show or hide the Magnetic Mask Editor.; Use the Quantec QRS (Quantec Room Simulator) effect to create natural and transparent audio reverbs that simulate real acoustic spaces.; Stay organized by renaming audio effects in the inspector.; Reveal the source of a multicam angle or synced clip in the browser.; Move markers in the timeline by dragging them in a clip, or remove markers by dragging them out of a clip.; Additional support and bug fixes: The Magnetic Mask Editor now closes automatically when the last Magnetic Mask is removed from a clip.; Improves reliability when batch exporting compound clips that contain Magnetic Masks.; Adds support for using Transcribe to Captions with a single audio role component.; Improves stability when dragging a library item to a text editor to generate an FCPXML.; Improves reliability when upgrading a library that contains 100 fps clips.; Improves reliability when sharing a project that includes ARRI ProRes MXF media.; Fixes an issue that prevented a LUT from being automatically applied when importing ARRIRAW MXF clips.; Improves performance when applying Smooth Slo-Mo to ProRes 4444 files with an alpha channel on Mac models with M1.; Fixes an issue that caused audio to go out of sync when adding 25 fps clips to a 23.98 fps timeline.; Fixes an issue that could cause sound to slip out of sync when detaching audio from a clip with a J-cut and a through edit.; Fixes an issue that caused an MP3 or AAC audio file to have a truncated audio waveform after export.; Fixes an issue that caused black frames to be displayed when playing back HEVC clips from a RED camera.; Fixes an issue that prevented the browser from automatically scrolling to an active cell in list view.; Fixes an issue that caused the selected browser clip to change when Show Hidden Clips was enabled.
11.2	September 19, 2025	Unlock even more controls for ProRes RAW video shot on iPhone, so you can adjust exposure, color temperature, tint, and demosaicing. (ProRes RAW capture requires supported iPhone models.); Edit and play back your Apple Log 2 footage with the vibrancy of the original scene by applying the Apple Log 2 LUT.; Fixes an issue that caused recordings made with the Voiceover tool to not be saved when media storage was set to a location outside the library.; Improves stability when adjusting sliders in the ProRes RAW Settings window.; Fixes an issue that caused Final Cut Pro to quit when RED RAW clips were selected in the timeline while the RED RAW Settings window was open.; Removes support for FireWire-connected devices on macOS Tahoe. (On macOS Sequoia, FireWire capture is supported, but the playback controls for FireWire-connected devices are no longer available.); Includes stability and performance improvements.

For a complete overview of the changes made, see Apple's release notes.

=== Final Cut Pro for iPad ===
Final Cut Pro for iPad was released on May 23, 2023. It requires an iPad with an M-series chip and is available only through the software as a service model for $4.99 a month or $49 a year.

== Made with Final Cut Pro ==
=== With Final Cut Pro 1 to 7 ===
- O Brother, Where Art Thou? (2000)
- The Rules of Attraction (2002)
- Full Frontal (2002)
- The Ring (2002)
- Cold Mountain (2003) (Academy Award nominee for Best Editing – Walter Murch)
- Intolerable Cruelty (2003)
- Open Water (2003)
- Napoleon Dynamite (2004)
- The Ladykillers (2004)
- Sky Captain and the World of Tomorrow (2004)
- Super Size Me (2004)
- Corpse Bride (2005)
- Dreamer: Inspired by a True Story (2005)
- Happy Endings (2005)
- In the Shadow of the Palms (2005)
- Jarhead (2005)
- Little Manhattan (2005)
- Me and You and Everyone We Know (2005)
- 300 (2006)
- Black Snake Moan (2006)
- Happy Feet (2006)
- Inland Empire (2006)
- Zodiac (2007)
- The Simpsons Movie (2007)
- No Country for Old Men (2007) (Academy Award nominee for Best Editing – Roderick Jaynes)
- Reign Over Me (2007)
- Youth Without Youth (2007)
- Balls of Fury (2007)
- Gabriel (2007)
- Enchanted (2007)
- Garoto Cósmico (2008)
- Traitor (2008)
- Burn After Reading (2008)
- The X-Files: I Want to Believe (2008)
- The Curious Case of Benjamin Button (2008) (Academy Award nominee for Best Editing - Kirk Baxter and Angus Wall)
- X-Men Origins: Wolverine (2009)
- (500) Days of Summer (2009)
- Where the Wild Things Are (2009)
- A Serious Man (2009)
- Tetro (2009)
- By the People: The Election of Barack Obama (2009)
- Gamer (2009)
- Eat Pray Love (2010)
- Twixt (2011)
- The Social Network (2011) (Academy Award winner for Best Editing – Kirk Baxter and Angus Wall)
- Courageous (2011)
- John Carter (2012)
- Hemingway & Gellhorn (2012)
- The Patrol (2013)
- A Most Violent Year (2014)
- Focus (2015)
- What Happened, Miss Simone? (2015)
- Tangerine (2015)
- Whiskey Tango Foxtrot (2016)
- Saved By Grace (2016)
- 79 Parts (2016)
- Parasite (2019) (Academy Award nominee for Best Editing – Yang Jin-mo)

=== With Final Cut Pro X ===
Film

- Young Detective Dee: Rise of the Sea Dragon (2013)
- Loreak (2014)
- Focus (2015)
- Well Wishes (2015)
- What Happened, Miss Simone? (2015)
- La isla del viento (2015)
- 600 Miles (2015)
- Just Let Go (2015)
- An Autumn Without Berlin (2015)
- The Chosen (2015)
- Saved by Grace (2016)
- Tangerine (2015)
- Whiskey Tango Foxtrot (2016)
- Saturday's Warrior (2016)
- Voice from the Stone (2016)
- El Hombre de las Mil Caras (2016)
- Bokeh (2016)
- Everything Else (2016)
- La historia de Jan (2016)
- The Unknown Soldier (2017)
- Flesh And Blood (2017)
- Daisy Winters (2017)
- Handia (2017)
- Brothers' Nest (2018)
- Sleep Has Her House (2017)
- Dead Envy (2018)
- Gabriel (2018)
- Off The Tracks (Documentary) (2018)
- Jezebel (2019)
- The Banker (2020)
- Faith Based (2020)
- Wild Amsterdam (2018) (Documentary)
- Fragments of Truth (Documentary) (2018)
- The Isle (2018 film) (2018)
- Unhinged (2017)
- Sleep Has Her House (2017)
- Psychosynthesis (2019)
- Shadows on the Road (2018)
- Against the Clock (2019)
- Chasing Molly (2019)
- Follow Me (2020)
- Monsters of Man (2020)
- Gaia (2021)
- Bo Burnham: Inside (2021)
- Blood Red Sky (2021)
- Thariode (2021)
- Vazhiye (2022)
- Becoming the Queen of the North (2022)
- The Stars Align (2024)
- Dreadful Chapters (2023)

Television

- Have I Got News For You (2020)
- BBC News (2014)
- Trailer Park Boys (2012)
- Leverage (2012)
- George to the Rescue (2013)
- Drag Queens of London (2014)
- O.J. Speaks: The Hidden Tapes (2015)
- Paramedics: Emergency Response (2015)
- Challenger Disaster: Lost Tapes (2016)
- Scott the Woz (2017)
- Conquistadores Adventum (2017)
- Diana: In Her Own Words (2017)
- La Peste (2018)
- Dogs Of Berlin (2018)
- Matchday: Inside FC Barcelona (2019)
- Salvados (2019)
- La Línea: Shadow of Narco (2020)
- Q: Into the Storm (2021)

== See also ==
- Motion, a companion app by Apple for motion graphics and effects
- Compressor, a companion app by Apple for advanced encoding
- Apple ProRes, a video-encoding format
- iMovie, Apple's consumer video-editing app
- Final Cut Studio, a discontinued software suite which included Final Cut Pro and other Apple film-editing apps
- Final Cut Express, a discontinued edition of Final Cut with fewer features sold at a lower price
- List of video editing software
- Comparison of video editing software
