= Final Cut Studio =

Suite of software including Final Cut Pro

- Developer(s): Apple Inc.
- Operating system: Mac OS X
- Type: Non-linear editing system
- License: Proprietary
- Website: Final Cut Studio

Final Cut Studio is a discontinued suite of professional video production and post-production made by Apple for the Mac. The suite competed with Avid Media Composer for the high-end movie production market. It first went on sale in 2005.

In 2011, after the release of Final Cut Pro X, Apple discontinued Final Cut Studio, Final Cut Express, and Final Cut Server. Upon its discontinuation, Final Cut Studio was no longer on sale in Apple Stores or on Apple's website, but was still available through Apple's phone sales. Its three primary applications Final Cut Pro, Motion, and Compressor, are still actively developed, and available on the Mac App Store. As of 2017, Final Cut Pro 7 no longer runs on macOS High Sierra or later; it can be patched to run on recent versions of macOS, though this is not supported by Apple.

== Components ==
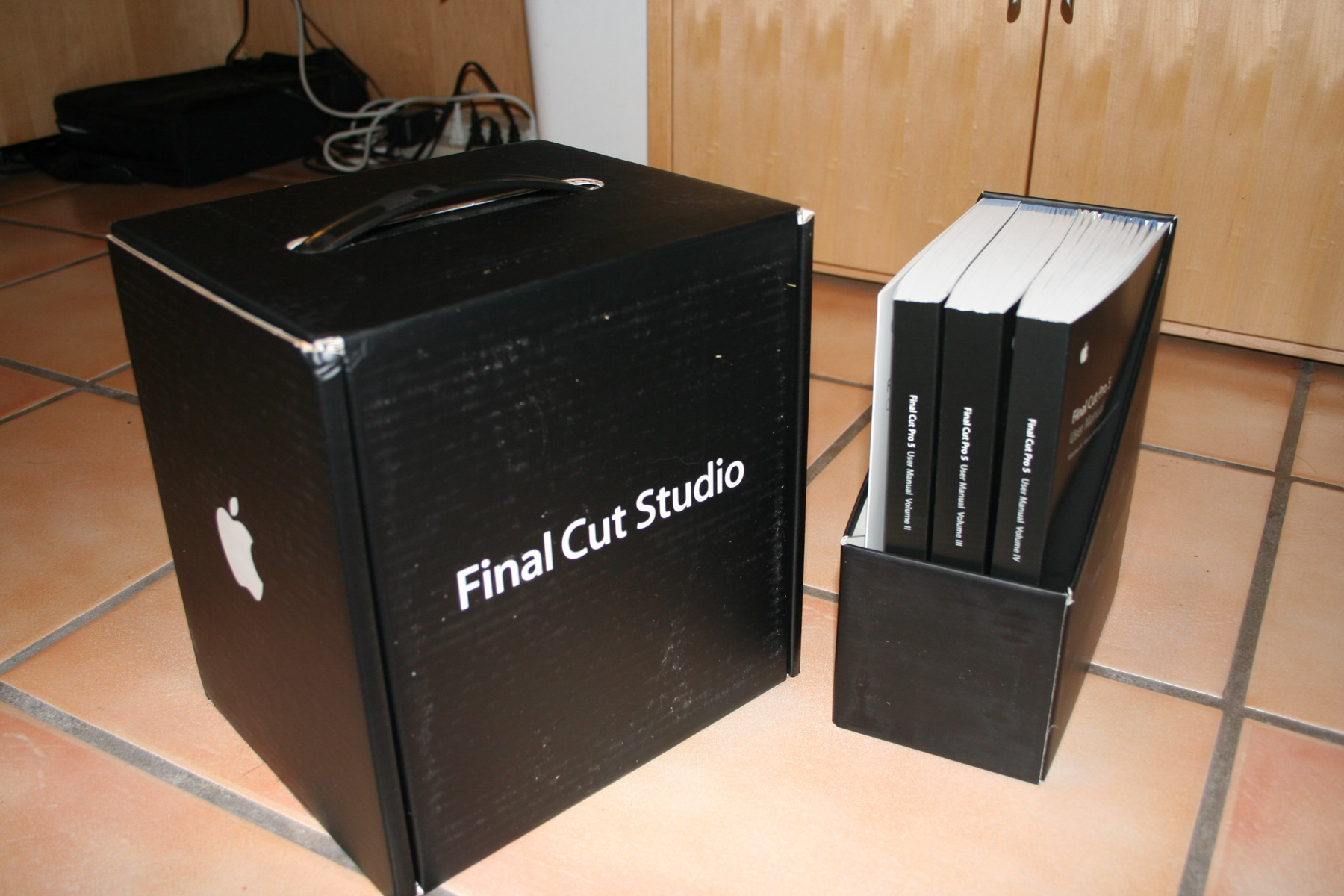
Final Cut Studio from 2006

Final Cut Studio version 3 was released on July 23, 2009. It was the final release upon discontinuation of the suite and contains six main applications and several smaller applications used in content creation.

- Final Cut Pro 7 – "real-time editing for DV, SD and HD"
- Motion 4 – "real-time motion graphics design"
- Soundtrack Pro 3 – "advanced audio editing and sound design"
- DVD Studio Pro 4 – encoding, authoring and burning.
- Color 1.5 – a new color grading application adapted from Silicon Color's FinalTouch.
- Compressor 3.5 – a video encoding tool for outputting projects in different formats.
- Cinema Tools 4.5 – tools specific to film processing.
- Qmaster 3 – a distributed processing tool.

The applications are designed to integrate as a suite, to form a workflow. In particular:

- Final Cut Pro sequences can be exported to Soundtrack Pro for audio tweaking or music scoring
- Final Cut Pro sequences can be sent to Compressor, for encoding in an external format
- Final Cut Pro sequences can be exported to Motion, for motion graphics overlays, or LiveType, specifically for title overlays
- LiveType projects can be opened in Final Cut Pro without needing to be exported first
- Motion projects can be incorporated into DVD Studio Pro menus without needing to be exported first
- LiveFonts from LiveType can be used in Motion.

Final Cut Pro and Motion also integrate directly with Apple's discontinued Shake, a digital compositing package.

== History ==
Production Suite is a software compilation by Apple used for digital video editing. Production Suite contains Final Cut Pro HD, DVD Studio Pro 3, and Apple Motion. The compilation's component applications were announced at the National Association of Broadcasters in April 2004, and the compilation was released in August 2004.

Final Cut Studio was introduced at the National Association of Broadcasters in April 2005, as the successor to Production Suite. It added new versions of all the Production Suite applications: Final Cut Pro, DVD Studio Pro and Motion. It also introduces a new application, Soundtrack Pro, which is a new version of Soundtrack, formerly included with Final Cut Pro. In January 2006, Final Cut Studio became the only way to purchase any of the individual major applications. In March 2006, Apple released the Universal Binary version as Final Cut Studio 1.1.

=== Release history ===
Date	Releases
NAB 1999	Final Cut Pro
MWSF 2001	DVD Studio Pro
March 2001	Final Cut Pro 2
December 2001	Final Cut Pro 3
April 2002	Cinema Tools
NAB 2002	DVD Studio Pro 1.5
NAB 2003	Final Cut Pro 4, DVD Studio Pro 2, LiveType, Soundtrack, Compressor
NAB 2004	Final Cut Pro HD, DVD Studio Pro 3, Motion, LiveType 1.2, Soundtrack 1.2, Compressor 1.2
August 2004	Production Suite
NAB 2005	Final Cut Studio: Final Cut Pro 5, DVD Studio Pro 4, Motion 2, LiveType 2, Soundtrack Pro, Compressor 2
March 2006	Final Cut Studio released as a Universal application.
NAB 2007	Final Cut Studio 2: Final Cut Pro 6, DVD Studio Pro 4, Motion 3, LiveType 2, Soundtrack Pro 2, Color, Compressor 3
July 2009	Final Cut Studio (2009): Final Cut Pro 7, DVD Studio Pro 4, Motion 4, Soundtrack Pro 3, Color 1.5, Compressor 3.5
July 2011	Final Cut Pro X, Motion 5, Compressor 4

== Marketing ==
Final Cut Studio has been positioned as an all-in-one production workflow system because of its integration of film, motion graphics and audio post-production tools in one suite. It is analogous to the iLife suite, which is aimed at consumers, insomuch as iMovie is the consumer counterpart of Final Cut Pro; GarageBand 3 is a consumer version of Logic Pro and Soundtrack Pro; and iDVD is the cut-down version of DVD Studio Pro. Like Motion, iMovie includes Core Image effects that can be applied in real time.

=== High Definition ===
In the Macworld Conference and Expo 2005, Steve Jobs, former CEO of Apple, declared 2005 to be the "Year of HD". To this end, the HD features of Final Cut Studio were emphasized, such that a little HD logo was placed on the box for each individual Studio application, as well as the Final Cut Studio box.

Final Cut Pro supports nearly all High Definition formats (HDV, DVCPRO HD, AVCHD, and uncompressed HD) and Soundtrack Pro and Motion can import these formats too, where they can be played back on an external monitor. DVD Studio Pro supports the HD DVD 1.0 specification. See DVD Studio Pro.

=== Packaging ===
The design for the packaging and websites for each application are consistent to a demonstration video shown at the product's introduction at NAB 2005. This video also includes reference to Shake 4 – a high-end digital compositing application that integrates with Final Cut Pro but is not included in Final Cut Studio.

=== Case studies ===
To market the Studio components, Apple compiled a set of case studies of real-world users of the applications. For Final Cut Pro, they used Bunim-Murray Productions' uses of the program in their The Real World reality television show. For Soundtrack Pro, Walter Murch became their advocate – a film editor and sound designer who worked on Cold Mountain and The Godfather. For Motion, Apple used the example of Mekanism and their creation of a TV spot designed to persuade young people to vote. And for DVD Studio Pro, the example of Relevant was used, who used the application in a unique, interactive movie called Backwoods to Brooklyn.

== See also ==
- Non-linear video editing
- List of video editing software
- Comparison of video editing software
- Shake (software)
