= Motion (software) =

Video software application produced by Apple Inc.

- Logos for the one-time purchase version (left) and Apple Creator Studio version (right)

- Screenshot Of Motion 5
- Developer: Apple Inc.
- Stable release: 6.4 / September 29, 2026; 0 days ago
- Operating system: macOS (26.6 or later)
- Size: 3.28 GB
- Type: Compositing/Visual Effects/Animation
- License: Proprietary
- Website: apple.com/final-cut-pro

Motion is a software application produced by Apple Inc. for their macOS operating system. It is used to create and edit motion graphics, titling for video production and film production, and 2D and 3D compositing for visual effects.

== History ==
The original product, codenamed "Molokini," was previewed at a NAB event on April 19, 2004.

Version 1.0 was made available on August 11, 2004.

At a pre-NAB event in April 2005, Apple released Motion 2 along with new revisions of the other Pro applications, optimised for the Power Mac G5 and Mac OS X 10.4. Features introduced in Motion 2:

- 32-bit Rendering
- Replicators
- New filters
- MIDI behavior
- After Effects integration

In January 2006 Apple stopped selling Motion as a stand-alone product. Introduced at NAB in Las Vegas on April 15, 2007, Motion 3 was included as part of the Final Cut Studio 2 suite. Features introduced in Motion 3:

- 3D multiplane environment - 2.5D compositing
- 3D text behaviors
- Vector-based paint strokes
- Point tracking and match moving
- Image stabilization and SmoothCam
- Synchronized Audio behavior
- Dynamic retiming behaviors
- Advanced Keyframe Editor - keyframe pen tool, transform box
- Final Cut Pro integration - Motion 3 master templates

Motion 4 was introduced on July 23, 2009. New features included:

- 3D Shadows
- 3D Reflections
- Depth of Field
- Credit Rolls
- Adjust Glyph tool
- Parameter Link behavior
- Camera framing
- Improved Sequence Text behavior, plus new presets
- New text generators
- New graphics generators
- New filters
- Multi-touch gesture support
- ProRes 4444 support
- Background export

Motion 5 was introduced on June 21, 2011. Motion 5 was once again sold as a stand-alone product. It is available through the Mac App Store at a reduced price of $49.99. New features:

- Final Cut Pro X plugin generation
- Parameter rigs
- New keyer
- 64-bit architecture

Motion 5.2 was released on April 13, 2015. New features:

- 3D text
- New generators
- Improved shapes
- Improved keyframing

Motion 5.3 was released on October 27, 2016.

- Wide color
- Improved Link parameter behavior
- New Align To behavior
- Improved 3D text

Motion 5.4 was released on December 14, 2017, with new features:

- 360 VR motion graphics support
- The ability to switch a current Motion document to be a Motion project, Final Cut Pro generator, Final Cut Pro title, Final Cut Pro effect, or Final Cut Pro transition
- New Overshoot animation behavior
- New filters for different photographic looks
- Import, playback, and editing of HEVC video clips and HEIF photos.
- Faster optical flow analysis

Motion 5.4.1 was released on April 9, 2018. New feature:

- ProRes RAW
- Bug fixes

Motion 5.4.2 was released on November 15, 2018. New features:

- Advanced color grading
- Comic filter
- Tiny Planet filter - for displaying 360° spherical video in non-360° projects
- Bug fixes - including use of Core Text engine for improved display of non-roman text

Motion 5.4.3 was released on March 21, 2019. New feature:

- Post-macOS Mojave media compatibility checker

Motion 5.4.4 was released on October 7, 2019.

- New Metal-based processing engine improves playback and accelerates graphics tasks including rendering, compositing, real-time effects, exporting, and more
- Enhances graphics performance with support for multiple GPUs including Radeon Pro Vega II and Radeon Pro Vega II Duo on Mac Pro
- Optimizes CPU performance with support for up to 28 CPU cores on Mac Pro
- Accelerates ProRes and ProRes RAW playback when using the Afterburner card on Mac Pro
- View, composite, grade, and deliver stunning HDR video on Pro Display XDR
- View High Dynamic Range video tone-mapped to compatible Standard Dynamic Range displays when using Motion on macOS Catalina
- Improved load balancing of graphics processing across multiple GPUs

Motion 5.4.6 was released on August 25, 2020. 3D object support

- Add 3D objects as elements in Title, Generator, Effect and Transition templates
- Animate a 3D object's position, rotation, and scale using keyframes
- Use behaviors to easily add realistic and complex animations to 3D objects
- Use 3D objects with tools like replicators, emitters, lights or cameras
- Use a collection of 60 premade 3D objects in the Motion library
- Import USDZ objects from third-party websites and developers
- Adjust 3D object environment lighting in the project inspector

Motion 5.5.1 was released on March 4, 2021.

- Adds a new Auto-Shrink option to the Text Layout tab of the Inspector to automatically reduce text size to fit in a paragraph, scroll, or crawl layout
- Includes UI refinements for macOS Big Sur
- Includes stability and reliability improvements

Motion is available as part of the Apple Creator Studio subscription suite, alongside the standalone purchasable Mac App Store version.

See also a release history in context with the rest of Final Cut Studio.

== Features ==
Features of Motion include the ability to create custom particle effects (as well as using pre-built ones) and to add filters, effects and animations in real time. Motion has the ability to address up to 32 GB of RAM and GPU acceleration at 8-bit, 16-bit and 32-bit float color depths. Motion 2 can also integrate with a MIDI keyboard, so that parameters can be controlled by keys or faders; this opens up the possibility of real time parameter input into Motion. In addition Motion 3 now allows for complete 2D and 3D compositing in a multiplane environment.

=== Behaviors ===
As well as supporting traditional keyframe animation, Motion introduced a system of pre-set 'behaviors' which can be combined to create realistic animations. For instance, the 'throw' behavior will move an object across the screen. Combined with the 'gravity' behavior, it will simulate a realistic arc of motion. The effects can be tweaked utilizing various parameters, varying the strength of the bounces, the amount of gravity to apply and so on.

This is very different from traditional animation software, which requires the use of keyframes to determine the position of an object at any given time. Such software then automatically creates motion to fill the spaces between the keyframes. This makes it easy to know exactly where objects are on the screen at any given time, but it is considerably more difficult to create realistic animations that build up on different, conflicting forces.

=== The Replicator and Particle Emitters ===
In Version 2 a new 'replicator' function was introduced, which allows an object to be replicated to create a repeating pattern of a specified size and shape. With this tool, it is possible to create animations in which the elements of a replicated pattern move in sequence.

'Particle emitters' allow the user to set a pre-drawn shape to rapidly generate copies of itself and emit them across the screen. The direction and intensity can be adjusted, and combined with behaviors to create very complex animations quickly and easily. For example, a particle emitter used in conjunction with a star shape and the 'vortex' behavior would animate a circle of swirling stars.

=== The H.U.D. ===
Motion features a floating semi-transparent window ("heads-up display", or HUD) which displays the most commonly altered parameters of the object or effect currently selected. This allows the user to make quick adjustments without having to search through palettes and menus. However, exact numerical values cannot be entered in this window. For more precise editing, consult the Inspector window.

=== Tools ===
Motion has the following tools available for the creation or manipulation of graphics on the canvas:

- Anchor point - each object has an 'anchor point' that acts as the center of rotation or enlargement.
- Shear mapping
- Drop shadow
- Four Corner, which changes the perspective of objects.
- Crop
- Bézier curve adjustment
- Rectangle, ellipse, Bézier curve and B-spline creation tools.
- The text tool.
- Rectangle, ellipse, Bézier and B-spline masking tools (which define the part of an object that is visible).

These tools can be accessed from the toolbar at the top of the screen or with keyboard commands.

=== Recording ===
Recording is used for adjusting an object over a specific amount of time by placing and manipulating keyframes. The recording button is a red dot button adjacent to the play/pause features. When the button is selected, it lights up red and the dot turns white. Any adjustments made when the button is selected are saved as keyframes. Keyframes act as placeholders that solidify an object's characteristics at a single frame (anything from position and rotation to cropping and size). Using multiple recordings, an object shall reorient itself between the two keyframes to match each set characteristics. Recording can act as an alternative to movement behaviors that allow more in-depth adjustments.

== See also ==
- Nuke – The Foundry
- Autodesk Flame – Autodesk
- Adobe After Effects
- VSDC Free Video Editor
- Fusion – Blackmagic Design
- Boris RED – Boris FX
- Natron
