= IDisk =

Discontinued file hosting service

The iDisk icon as it appeared in Mac OS X from versions 10.5.4 to 10.5.7.

iDisk is a file hosting service that was offered by Apple Inc. initially to all Mac OS 9 users, and later to .Mac and MobileMe subscribers that enabled them to store their digital photos, films and personal files online so they could be accessed remotely. All Mac OS 9 users received a free 20MB iDisk, with a 400MB paid subscription option added shortly after the iDisk launch. With a standard .Mac subscription, users received a 10GB iDisk. With MobileMe, the standard storage was increased to 20GB.

iDisk integrated with Mac OS X, appearing as a network drive. Mac OS X 10.3 (Panther) through 10.6 (Snow Leopard) could cache updates to an iDisk volume while off-line and synchronize updates later. Any WebDAV client could also access an iDisk volume.

Apple discontinued iDisk, along with many MobileMe (formerly .Mac and iTools) products in 2012. iDisk users could sign up for the iCloud beta or download their files.

== Folders ==
- The "Sites" folder of a MobileMe iDisk contained the files created by HomePage, the MobileMe online web authoring tool.
- The "Web" folder of a MobileMe iDisk contained the files created by iWeb, part of the iLife suite.
- The "Software" folder of a MobileMe iDisk contained MobileMe exclusive software, such as GarageBand Jam Packs.
- The "Public" folder of a MobileMe iDisk was used to host downloads.

The "Public", "Sites" and "Web" folders were the only ones which could be accessed by people other than the iDisk owner, but the "Public" folder could be made password protected via the MobileMe Preference Pane in Mac OS X.

== Backup application ==
Included with iDisk in the MobileMe bundle was Backup, a software utility that allowed users to back up local files to an iDisk. The software was also used to restore files from the iDisk, or any other drive/location selected in the backup app.

== See also ==
- Apple Inc.
- macOS
- MobileMe
- iCloud
- WebDAV
- File hosting service
- Google Drive
- Dropbox
- OneDrive (previously SkyDrive)
