= IReview =

Cancelled service by Apple Computer

iReview was a service offered by Apple Computer (now Apple Inc.) dedicated to reviews of Internet content. During the 2000 Macworld Conference in San Francisco, Apple CEO Steve Jobs introduced this service along with iTools, which was the free predecessor to Apple's current iCloud subscription service.

iReview was part of a reaction to the commercial success of the iMac that resulted in thousands of new computer owners suddenly having access to the Internet. The main purpose of the service was to give new users a place for detailed reviews on websites on the World Wide Web. iReview was integrated into the Apple website as part of the new "tabbed" layout, with a dedicated tab alongside iCards, iTools, the online store, QuickTime, and online support. Once a visitor clicked on the iReview tab, they could choose from one of 15 categories of websites for specific reviews on subjects that may be of interest. Each initial review was published by Apple employees, who gave their input on the site along with a detailed review and an overall rating. Visitors to iReview were also able to review and rate the sites themselves as well. Users could organize the viewing of reviews by ratings or by simple searches.

== Cancellation ==
In February 2001, Apple cancelled the iReview service. Its failure to generate traffic is generally attributed to a lack of awareness of the service by most web users, a lack of perceived openness of the system, and the idea that most people would typically not spend time reading others' opinions of websites when they could quickly generate their own opinions by visiting the sites themselves.
