= Bundle (macOS) =

Type of directory bundle

- Filename extension: .app, .framework, .kext, .plugin, .docset, .xpc, .qlgenerator, .component, .saver, .mdimporter, etc.
- Uniform Type Identifier (UTI): com.apple.bundle
- Container for: executable binary, metadata, other bundles, any other file needed to run the application.

In NeXTSTEP, OPENSTEP, and their lineal descendants macOS, iOS, iPadOS, tvOS, watchOS, and visionOS, and in GNUstep, a bundle is a file directory with a defined structure and file extension, allowing related files to be grouped together as a conceptually single item.

Examples of bundles that contain executable code include applications, frameworks, and plugins. This kind of bundle usually contains one file representing executable code, and files that represent resources such as nibs, templates, images, sounds, and other media. On some other systems, such as Microsoft Windows, these resources are usually included directly in the executable file itself at compile time. On older Macintoshes, a similar technique is used, where additional metadata can be added to a file's resource fork. Similar in concept are the application directories used in RISC OS and on the ROX Desktop.

Examples of bundles that do not contain executable code include document packages (iWork documents) and media libraries (iPhoto Library).

Bundles are programmatically accessed with the NSBundle class in Cocoa, NeXTSTEP and GNUstep's Foundation frameworks, and with CFBundle in Core Foundation. Bundles often include an Info.plist file for metadata. The Uniform Type Identifier (UTI) for an Apple bundle is com.apple.bundle.

== Application bundles ==
Application bundle
- Filename extension: .app
- Uniform Type Identifier (UTI): com.apple.application-bundle
- Type of format: application software
- Container for: executable binary
- Extended from: Bundle

Application bundles are directory hierarchies, with the top-level directory having a name that ends with a .app extension.

In a macOS application bundle, the first directory in the bundle underneath the top-level directory is usually named Contents. Within Contents there is usually another directory, called MacOS, which contains the application's executable code. The Contents folder contains a file named Info.plist, which contains application information, such as the software vendor's name, name of the files that contain the applications executable and icon, the version of the application, permissions requested, etc. Within the Contents folder there is usually also a directory called Resources, which contains the resources of the application.

Among other things, the Resources folder contains localized versions of the application's nib files.

Other common subdirectories include PlugIns, Frameworks, _CodeSignature and Shared Frameworks. The Frameworks directory contains frameworks used by the application, and are used even if another version of the framework exists on the system. The Shared Frameworks directory contains frameworks that can be used both by the application that contains them, and other applications; they are used only if a newer version does not exist elsewhere on the system. PlugIns contains extensible code used by the application. The _CodeSignature folder contains information used by the system to validate that the package to establish that the package originates from a trusted party, and has not been tampered with.

By default, the Finder displays application bundles, which can also be referred to as packages, as opaque files with no underlying structure; the contents of the bundle can be shown with the "Show Package Contents" context menu item.

GNUstep by default uses the name of the application to name the folder that contains application code. An alternative is to name them by the computer architecture and OS the code is intended for to form a fat binary, so the application can be opened on many platforms.

== macOS framework bundles ==
Framework bundle
- Filename extension: .framework
- Uniform Type Identifier (UTI): com.apple.framework
- Extended from: bundle

macOS frameworks are also stored as bundles; the top-level directory of a framework bundle has a name that is the name of the framework followed by the extension .framework. In the top-level directory is a Versions directory, with subdirectories for one or more versions of the framework, each subdirectory containing the dynamic library code for the framework, in a file whose name is the same as the name of the framework, possibly with a Headers folder containing header files for the framework, and other subfolders such as Resources. The Versions directory also contains a symbolic link Current to the directory for the current version of the framework. In the top-level directory are symbolic links to the contents of Versions/Current.

The Finder displays framework bundles as directories rather than as opaque files.

Although GNUstep uses frameworks, they are not usually stored as bundles. This is because the full semantics of framework loading are considered too alien to other platforms.

== Loadable bundles ==
Loadable bundles are bundles which contain code that can be loaded at runtime. Loadable bundles usually have the extension .bundle, and are most often used as plug-ins. On macOS, there is a way to load bundles even into applications that do not support them, allowing for third party hacks for popular applications, such as Safari and Apple Mail. A feature inherited from NeXTSTEP, GNUstep has the -[NSBundle principalClass] interface too.

By default, the Finder displays loadable bundles, which can also be referred to as packages, as opaque files with no underlying structure; the contents of the bundle can be shown with the "Show Package Contents" context menu item.

== Other bundle formats ==
There are many macOS applications which utilize their own custom bundle format (e.g., CandyBar .iContainer, Aperture .aplibrary, VMware Fusion .vmwarevm, etc.).

== .lproj ==
An .lproj file is a bundle that contains localization files for OpenStep, macOS, or GNUstep software. It typically contains the .nib files for a given language along with .strings files and images if needed (for example, ReadMe or license files). These localized files are used by installer makers to customize install packages. They are also included in an application bundle.

== See also ==
- Application Directory — the RISC OS analogue to an application bundle
- AppImage — A Linux application that makes use of similar principles
- App — A HarmonyOS application that makes use of similar principles
- Rich Text Format Directory — the RTF extension by Apple using bundles
