= IWork =

Office suite of applications created by Apple

iWork

iWork suite, clockwise from top left: Pages, Numbers and Keynote on macOS; and iWork for iCloud
- Original author: Apple
- Developer: Apple
- Release: January 11, 2004; 22 years ago
- Stable release: 14.0 / 2 April 2024
- Written in: Objective-C, C, JavaScript
- Operating system: Online: Clients: All devices with a modern web browser Apps: iOS, iPadOS, and macOS
- Platform: x86-64 ARM (A4 and M1 onward); PowerPC (until 2009)
- Predecessor: AppleWorks
- Successor: Apple Creator Studio
- Type: Office suite
- License: Proprietary; Freeware and commercial
- Website: iWork; Pages; Numbers; Keynote

iWork is an office suite of applications created by Apple for its macOS, iPadOS, and iOS operating systems, and also available cross-platform through the iCloud website.

iWork includes the presentation application Keynote, the word-processing and desktop-publishing application Pages, and the spreadsheet application Numbers. Apple's design goals in creating iWork have been to allow Mac users to easily create attractive documents and spreadsheets, making use of macOS's extensive font library, integrated spelling checker, sophisticated graphics APIs and its AppleScript automation framework.

The equivalent Microsoft Office applications to Pages, Numbers, and Keynote are Word, Excel, and PowerPoint, respectively. Although Microsoft Office applications cannot open iWork documents, iWork applications can open Office documents for editing, and export documents from iWork's native formats (.pages, .numbers, .key) to Microsoft Office formats (.docx, .xlsx, .pptx, etc.) as well as to PDF files.

The oldest application in iWork is Keynote, first released as a standalone application in 2003 for use by Steve Jobs in his presentations. Steve Jobs announced Keynote saying "It's for when your presentation really matters".

Pages was released with the first iWork bundle in 2004; Numbers was added in 2007 with the release of iWork '08. The next release, iWork '09, also included beta access to iWork.com, an online service that allowed users to upload and share documents on the web, now integrated into Apple's iCloud service. A version of iWork for iOS was released in 2010 with the first iPad, and the apps have been regularly updated since, including the addition of iPhone support. In 2013, Apple launched iWork web apps in iCloud; even years later, however, their functionality is somewhat limited compared to equivalents on the desktop.

iWork was initially sold as a suite for $79, then later at $19.99 per app on OS X and $9.99 per app on iOS. Apple announced in October 2013 that all iOS and OS X devices purchased onwards, whether new or refurbished, would be eligible for a free download of all three iWork apps: after device setup, the user can "claim" the apps on the App Store, after which they are permanently linked to the user’s Apple ID (now Apple Account). iWork for iCloud, which also incorporates a document hosting service, is free to all iCloud users. iWork was released for free on macOS and iOS (including older or resold devices) in April 2017.

In September 2016, Apple announced that the real-time collaboration feature would be available for all iWork apps.

== History ==
The first version of iWork, iWork '05, was announced on January 11, 2005 at the Macworld Conference & Expo and made available on January 22 in the United States and on January 29 worldwide. iWork '05 comprised two applications: Keynote 2, a presentation creation program, and Pages, a word processor. iWork '05 was sold for US$79. A 30-day trial was also made available for download on Apple's website. Originally IGG Software held the rights to the name iWork.

While iWork was billed by Apple as "a successor to AppleWorks", it does not replicate AppleWorks's database and drawing tools. However, iWork integrates with existing applications from Apple's iLife suite through the Media Browser, which allows users to drag and drop music from iTunes, movies from iMovie, and photos from iPhoto and Aperture directly into iWork documents.

iWork '06 was released on January 10, 2006 and contained updated versions of both Keynote and Pages. Both programs were released as universal binaries for the first time, allowing them to run natively on both PowerPC processors and the Intel processors used in the new iMac desktop computers and MacBook Pro notebooks which had been announced on the same day as the new iWork suite.

The next version of the suite, iWork '08, was announced and released on August 7, 2007 at a special media event at Apple's campus in Cupertino, California. iWork '08, like previous updates, contained updated versions of Keynote and Pages. A new spreadsheet application, Numbers, was also introduced. Numbers differed from other spreadsheet applications, including Microsoft Excel, in that it allowed users to create documents containing multiple spreadsheets on a flexible canvas using a number of built-in templates.

iWork '09, was announced on January 6, 2009 and released the same day. It contains updated versions of all three applications in the suite. iWork '09 also included access to a beta version of the iWork.com service, which allowed users to share documents online until that service was decommissioned at the end of July 2012. Users of iWork '09 could upload a document directly from Pages, Keynote, or Numbers and invite others to view it online. Viewers could write notes and comments in the document, and download a copy in iWork, Microsoft Office, or PDF formats. iWork '09 was also released with the Mac App Store on January 6, 2011 at $19.99 per application, and received regular updates after this point, including links to iCloud and a high-DPI version designed to match Apple's MacBook Pro with Retina Display.

On January 27, 2010, Apple announced iWork for iPad, to be available as three separate $9.99 applications from the App Store. This version has also received regular updates including a version for pocket iPhone and iPod Touch devices, and an update to take advantage of Retina Display devices and the larger screens of recent iPhones.

On October 22, 2013, Apple announced an overhaul of the iWork software for both the Mac and iOS. Both suites were made available via the respective App Stores. The update is free for current iWork owners and was also made available free of charge for anyone purchasing an OS X or iOS device after October 1, 2013. Any user activating the newly free iWork apps on a qualifying device can download the same apps on another iOS or OS X device logged into the same App Store account.

The new OS X versions have been criticized for losing features such as multiple selection, linked text boxes, bookmarks, 2-up page views, mail merge, searchable comments, ability to read/export RTF files, default zoom and page count, integration with AppleScript. Apple has provided a road-map for feature re-introduction, stating that it hopes to reintroduce some missing features within the next six months. As of April 1, 2014 a few features—e.g., the ability to set the default zoom—had been reintroduced, though scores had not.

Due to using a completely new file format that can work across macOS, Windows, and in most web browsers by using the online iCloud web apps, versions of iWork beginning with iWork 13 and later do not open or allow editing of documents created in versions prior to iWork '09, with users who attempt to open older iWork files being given a pop-up in the new iWork 13 app versions telling them to use the previous iWork '09 (which users may or may not have on their machine) in order to open and edit such files. Accordingly, the current version for OS X (which was initially only compatible with OS X Mavericks 10.9 onwards) moves any previously installed iWork '09 apps to an iWork '09 folder on the users machine (in /Applications/iWork '09/), as a work-around to allow users continued use of the earlier suite in order to open and edit older iWork documents locally on their machine. In October 2015, Apple released an update to mitigate this issue, allowing users to open documents saved in iWork '06 and iWork '08 formats in the latest version of Pages.

In 2016, Apple announced that the real-time collaboration feature would be available for all iWork apps, instead of being constrained to using iWork for iCloud. The feature is comparable to Google Docs.

== Versions ==
=== Major releases ===
iWork bundle	Keynote version	Pages version	Numbers version	Media	Minimum OS	Binary	Release date	Ref.
iWork '05	2.0	1.0	—N/a	CD-ROM	10.3.6	PowerPC	January 22, 2005	
iWork '06	3.0	2.0	—N/a	DVD-ROM	10.3.9	Universal	January 10, 2006	
iWork '08	4.0	3.0	1.0	DVD-ROM	10.4.10	Universal	August 7, 2007	
iWork '09	5.0	4.0	2.0	DVD-ROM	10.4.11	Universal	January 6, 2009	
—N/a	6.0	5.0	3.0	Mac App Store	10.9	Intel	October 22, 2013	
—N/a	6.5	5.5.1	3.5	Mac App Store	10.10	Intel	October 16, 2014	
—N/a	7.0	6.0	4.0	Mac App Store	10.12	Intel	September 20, 2016	
—N/a	8.0	7.0	5.0	Mac App Store	10.12	Intel	March 27, 2018	
—N/a	9.0	8.0	6.0	Mac App Store	10.13	Intel	March 28, 2019	
—N/a	10.0			Mac App Store	10.14	Intel	April 1, 2020	
—N/a	11.0			Mac App Store	10.15	Universal 2	March 23, 2021	
—N/a	12.0			Mac App Store	11.0	Universal 2	April 7, 2022	
—N/a	13.0			Mac App Store	12.3	Universal 2	March 30, 2023	
—N/a	14.0			Mac App Store	13.0	Universal 2	April 2, 2024	
—N/a (Note: Bundled with Apple Creator Studio)	15.1			Mac App Store	15.6	Universal 2	January 28, 2026	
—N/a (Note: Bundled with Apple Creator Studio)	16.0			Mac App Store	26.0	Universal 2	November 18, 2026	

=== Updates ===
iWork '09 received several updates:

- iWork 9.0.3 DVD (for Mac OS X 10.5.6 "Leopard" or newer; released August 26, 2010)
- iWork 9.0.4 (for Mac OS X 10.5.6 "Leopard" or newer; released August 26, 2010)
- iWork 9.1 (for Mac OS X 10.6.6 "Snow Leopard" or newer; released July 20, 2011)
- iWork 9.3 (for Mac OS X 10.7.4 "Lion" or newer; released December 4, 2012)

The Mac App Store version of iWork was updated on October 15, 2015 for 10.10 "Yosemite" or newer. It is the final release to support 10.10 "Yosemite" and 10.11 "El Capitan". Keynote 6.6, Pages 5.6 and Numbers 3.6 are included.

iWork received a major update again on March 28, 2019 with Keynote 9.0, Pages 8.0 and Numbers 6.0.

== Components ==
=== Common components ===
Products in the iWork suite share a number of components, largely as a result of sharing underlying code from the Cocoa and similar shared application programming interfaces (APIs). Among these are the well known universal multilingual spell checker, which can also be found in products like Safari and Mail. Grammar checking, find and replace, style and color pickers are similar examples of design features found throughout the Apple application space.

Moreover, the applications in the iWork suite also share a new model of the document. In most document-based applications there is a particular data type which forms the basis of the application's view of the world, for instance, in word processors the text is the first-class citizen of the application, while in a spreadsheet it is the cells in the table. Other objects, images or charts for instance, are managed by being attached to, or referenced to, the underlying primary data type.

In iWork, all of the applications share a common underlying document format, the "canvas", a generic container type that provides layout and storage mechanisms. Each application then adds its own custom objects and places them on the canvas. Pages, for instance, conventionally opens with a single large text object on the canvas. To the user it appears to be a typical word processor, but they can grab the corner and re-size it as in a page layout application. In Numbers, one initially sees a grid of cells like any other spreadsheet, but the user is free to size it smaller than the canvas, and then add multiple grids, charts or even drawings to the same canvas.

The difference is subtle, as many of these features are also implemented in more traditional programs like Microsoft Excel. However, the difference in UI can be significant. In Excel, for instance, charts are stored as part of a sheet, and can be moved inadvertently through natural user actions. In Numbers, charts are, like everything else, part of the canvas, and changes to the sheet(s) are normally independent.

The iWork model bears some resemblance to the earlier Apple effort, OpenDoc. OpenDoc also used a single underlying document engine, along with a single on-disk format. Unlike iWork, however, OpenDoc also used a single application, in which various editors could be invoked. For instance, one could open a generic document, start a spreadsheet editor, then add a spreadsheet. iWork lacks this level of flexibility in editing terms, but maintains it in layout.

=== Desktop applications ===
==== Pages ====
Pages is a word processing application.

Besides basic word processing functionality, Pages includes templates designed by Apple to allow users to create various types of documents, including newsletters, invitations, stationery, and résumés, along with a number of education-themed templates for students and teachers, such as reports and outlines. Pages 5, a complete redesign, removed more than 100 of the features of Pages 4.x, including bookmarks, mail merge, linked text boxes, multiple section capability, ability to set default zoom. It has been slowly adding some back in subsequent 5.x releases (default zoom, for example, can now be set, but still no linked text boxes, multiple select, mail merge, book marks, and more than 90 other features that were present in version 4.3).

Along with Keynote and Numbers, Pages integrates with Apple's iLife suite. Using the Media Browser, users can drag and drop movies, photos and music directly into documents within the Pages application. A Full Screen view hides the menubar and toolbars, and an outline mode allows users to quickly create outlines which can easily be rearranged by dragging and dropping, as well as collapsed and expanded. Pages includes support for entering complex equations with MathType 6 and for reference citing using EndNote X2.

The Pages application can open and edit Microsoft Word documents (including DOC and Office Open XML files), and plain text documents. Pages 5 can no longer read or export rich text format documents, although some later versions can. Pages can also export documents in the DOC, PDF, and ePub formats. It cannot read or write OpenDocument file formats.

As a word-processing application targeted towards creating attractive documents for a range of applications such as lesson plans and newsletters, Pages competes with Microsoft Word, Microsoft Publisher (never ported to macOS), Apple's own free e-book and PDF authoring application iBooks Author, and Adobe's professional-market desktop publishing application InDesign.

==== Keynote ====
Keynote is an application used to create and play presentations. Its features are comparable to those of Microsoft PowerPoint, though Keynote contains several unique features. Keynote, like Pages and Numbers, integrates with the iLife application suite. Users can drag and drop media from iMovie, iTunes, iPhoto and Aperture directly into Keynote presentations using the Media Browser. Keynote contains a number of templates, transitions, and effects. Magic Move allows users to apply simple transitions to automatically animate images and text that are repeated on consecutive slides.

Apple formerly released a Keynote Remote application for iOS that let users view slides and presenter notes and control Keynote presentations with an iPhone or iPod Touch over a Wi-Fi network, but that functionality has been rolled into subsequent releases of the main Keynote iOS application.

Keynote supports a number of file formats. By default, presentations are saved as .key files. Keynote can open and edit Microsoft PowerPoint (.ppt) files. In addition, presentations can be exported as Microsoft PowerPoint files, QuickTime movies (which are also playable on iPod and iPhone), HTML files, and PDF files. Presentations can also be sent directly to iDVD, iTunes, GarageBand, iWeb, and to YouTube. The Keynote 09 file format is not backward compatible; .key files saved with Keynote '09 cannot be opened with earlier versions of Keynote.

==== Numbers ====
Numbers is a spreadsheet application that was added to the iWork suite in 2007 with the release of iWork '08. Numbers, like Microsoft Excel and other spreadsheet applications, lets users organize data into tables, perform calculations with formulas, and create charts and graphs using data entered into the spreadsheet. Numbers, however, differs from other spreadsheet applications in that it allows users to create multiple tables in a single document on a flexible canvas. Many prebuilt templates, including ones designed for personal finance, education, and business use, are included.

Numbers 2.0 was included with iWork '09, with several improvements. Charts that are pasted into Keynote and Pages are automatically updated across documents when they are changed in Numbers. Additionally, Numbers 2 lets users categorize data in tables by column, which can then be collapsed and summarized.

Numbers 3.6 added in the ability to open Numbers '08 spreadsheets, among other things.

=== Web services ===
==== iWork.com ====
iWork.com

- Available in: Multilingual
- Dissolved: July 31, 2012; 14 years ago
- Owner: Apple Inc.
- Website: iWork.com (archived at Wayback Machine)
- Commercial: Free while in beta; requires iWork '09
- Registration: Required (Apple Account)
- Launched: January 6, 2009; 17 years ago
- Current status: Defunct

iWork.com was a free service that enabled users to share iWork '09 documents online directly from within Pages, Keynote and Numbers. Users could click the iWork.com toolbar icon and login using their Apple Account to upload a document and invite others to view it online. Viewers could leave comments and notes on the document and download a copy in iWork, Microsoft Office, or PDF formats. Document owners could track comments at the iWork.com website.

It was released as a public beta on January 6, 2009 at the Macworld Conference & Expo. The iWork.com service provides a web interface for viewing, downloading, and commenting uploaded documents. In contrast to cloud-based office applications such as Google Docs and Office Online, it did not offer editing.

iWork.com supported uploading of Pages '09 documents, Keynote '09 presentations, and Numbers '09 spreadsheets. Users could download documents in both Microsoft Office and PDF formats, in addition to their native iWork formats. Uploading documents to iWork.com requires a copy of the iWork '09 software suite and an Apple ID. Viewing, commenting, and downloading require only a web browser and an invitation to view the document.

On March 9, 2012 Apple announced that iWork.com was shutting down and after July 31, users would be no longer be able to access documents on iWork.com or view them on the web. Instead, users can use iCloud to share documents between their computers (running OS X Mountain Lion) and their iOS devices. Users attempting to access the iWork.com site are re-directed to the Apple homepage.

==== iWork for iCloud ====
During the 2013 Apple Worldwide Developers Conference (WWDC) keynote speech, iWork for iCloud was announced for release at the same time as the next version of the app versions of iWork later in the year. The three apps for both iOS and OS X that form Apple's iWork suite (Pages, Numbers, and Keynote), will be made available on a web interface (named as Pages for iCloud, Numbers for iCloud, and Keynote for iCloud respectively), and accessed via the iCloud website under each users iCloud Apple ID login. They will also sync with the users iOS and OS X versions of the app, should they have them, via their iCloud Apple ID.

Later in 2013, iWork for iCloud update added support for real-time collaboration such that the same document could be opened by collaborators at the same time and everyone could make changes simultaneously. It took a few seconds for changes to propagate to other collaborators. This, however, could not work together with iOS and OS X apps, which would cause "out-of-sync" dialogs if editing together with collaborators using iWork for iCloud. In 2016, Apple announced that the real-time collaboration feature would be available to iOS and OS X apps.

This allows the user to edit and create documents on the web, using one of the supported browsers; currently Safari, Chrome, and Internet Explorer. It also means that Microsoft Windows users now have access to these native –previously only Apple device– document editing tools, via the web interface. iWork for iCloud has more limited set of features compared to the OS X version of the applications. For instance, the fonts available are more limited and the web version does not fully support printing and may display documents created with the support of external plug-ins incorrectly/improperly. In 2014, iWork for iCloud update adds 8 languages, 50 new fonts and improved editing in the cloud-based versions of Pages, Numbers and Keynote.

=== iOS apps ===
On June 7, 2010, while showcasing the new iPhone 4, Apple posted a few screenshots of the device in action and inadvertently showed the possibility of opening an email attachment inside of Keynote, leading some to believe that an iPhone version of the iWork suite would soon be available in the iOS App Store.

On June 28, 2010, several websites reported that in an attempt to sell AppleCare for the iPhone 4, several examples of services offered were given including one that read, "Using iWork for iPhone and other Apple-branded iPhone apps." These sites also report that it was quickly removed.

On May 31, 2011, Apple released a press statement that iWork would be available on the iOS app store for the iPhone and iPod Touch.

On September 10, 2013, Apple announced that iWork, iMovie and iPhoto would be available to download for free on new iOS devices activated after September 1.

== See also ==
- Comparison of office suites
- List of office suites
- Office Open XML software
