= Package (macOS) =

package
- Uniform Type Identifier (UTI): com.apple.package
- UTI conformation: public.directory
- Container for: documents, bundles

In the Apple macOS operating system, a package is a file system directory that is normally displayed to the user by the Finder as if it were a single file. Such a directory may be the top-level of a directory tree of objects stored as files, or it may be other archives of files or objects for various purposes, such as installer packages, or backup archives.

== Definition ==
The package is a common file system abstraction used by Apple operating systems, such as macOS and iOS. It is a directory that may contain a hierarchy of files or objects that represent a preserved, organized state. A package is displayed to users like a single file in the Finder application to avoid being changed by the user. However, the content of packages may be accessed through special keyboard and mouse combination events. For this purpose, the control-click, or right-click, menu displays a directive Show Package Contents.

Some documents may be represented as packages:

- Rich Text Format documents with images, which carry the .rtfd extension;
- Dashboard widgets;
- Partially downloaded files in Safari, which carry the .download extension;
- Final Cut Pro X Camera Archives, which contain multiple QuickTime videos and carry the .fcarch extension;
- project files in GarageBand, Keynote, Pages, Numbers, iMovie and Xcode;
- Installer packages.

The Uniform Type Identifier (UTI) for a package is com.apple.package.

=== Bundles ===
A package that has a standardized structure for storing executable code and its associated resources, is called a bundle.

== See also ==
- Installer (macOS)
