= FX Photo Studio (Mac) =

- Developer: MacPhun LLC
- Stable release: 2.5 / March 27, 2012; 14 years ago
- Operating system: macOS
- Type: Raster graphics editor
- Website: itunes.apple.com/app/fx-photo-studio/id433017759

FX Photo Studio is a digital photography application for macOS. It requires Mac OS X 10.6 or later.

== Product backstory ==
FX Photo Studio 1.0 was developed in 2011. It originated from the iPhone that existed since 2009, receiving the best photo editing app of the year 2011 title by the BestAppEver online portal. The version 1.0 was released on May, 16, 2011 and received recognition among Mac users. The app was last updated in March, 2012.

== Features ==
FX Photo Studio allows users to download pictures from the hard-drive, Aperture and the iPhoto library, crop, flip and rotate them, apply 173 effects and filters that make pictures look like they were taken with a film camera or like sketches, pop-art, or else. There are over 20 photo frames and borders (classic, grunge, lomo styles) available. Users are allowed to mix and customize effects, paint with them and save combinations. It is possible to edit gamma, hue and saturation, contrast and exposure. There is an extra feature of selective coloring. The maximum resolution for photos can be set up to 16 megapixels. In Options menu users can configure the maximum resolution, quality, hidden effects, online help, shake to apply a random effect, auto rotate image, add location info to the picture. FX Photo Studio for Mac is integrated with Aperture, Adobe Photoshop Lightroom, iPhoto, Adobe Photoshop.

The main effects are:

- Lomo
- Black & White
- Sketch
- Grunge
- Vintage
- Art
- Lo-Fi
- 3D
- Textures
- Cross Process
- Glow
- Hollywood FX
- Color Strokes
- Overlays

== FX Photo Studio Pro ==
FX Photo Studio Pro is a more expensive version of the application that contains additional features. It allows to work with RAW images and resolution up to 32 megapixels. There are more than 40 photo frames and borders and 20 more effects available in the Pro version. Users are allowed to revert image to original with a click on a button.

== Sharing ==
Users are allowed to share pictures through Facebook, Twitter, Flickr, and Tumblr, print them, send them using e-mail, and order pictures to be sent as postcards around the world.
