= Noiseless =

Image noise reduction application

- Developer: Macphun LLC
- Written in: Objective-C
- Operating system: Mac OS X
- Available in: English, French, German, Portuguese, Spanish, Dutch, Italian, Japanese, Chinese, Russian
- Type: Photo Editing Software
- Website: macphun.com/noiseless

Noiseless is an image noise reduction application by Macphun Software. The application is designed to reduce the noise found in digital photographs. The noise is often a result of snapping pictures in low light environments.

== Features ==
The software is designed for photos taken with smartphones: it utilises pixel-detail recovery, Smart Noise Reduction Technology, RAW noise reduction technology and one-click presets for swift results.

== Versions ==
- Noiseless in standard version offers presets for fast one-click results (8 presets), custom noise reduction presets, adjustable level of noise reduction, automatic smart noise identification technology, advanced technology for GoPro and other action cameras, advanced noise reduction for smartphone photos, adjust panel for fine-tuning the noise reduction, multiple compare modes, free trainings with pro photographers.
- Noiseless CK (former Pro) offers presets for fast one-click results (10 Pro Presets + 2 Presets for RAW), custom noise reduction presets, adjustable level of noise reduction, automatic smart noise identification technology, advanced technology for GoPro and other action cameras, advanced noise reduction for smartphone photos, adjust panel for fine-tuning the noise reduction, multiple compare modes, free trainings with pro photographers, advanced RAW noise reduction technology, adobe RGB / Pro Photo color space support, navigation view for easy image navigation, advanced controls for powerful detail recovery, plug-in support for Lightroom, Aperture and Adobe PS.

All versions have Crop Tool, Macphun App Center integration, sharing to social media, export to Aperture, Lightroom and Photoshop, possibility to import and export custom presets, and Macphun proprietary speed engine.

== Supported image formats ==
- RAW (.NEF, .CR2, .DNG, .ORF etc.) images 8-bit, 16-bit
- TIFF
- PNG
- JPEG
- Noiseless CK also supports .PSD

== System requirements ==
- Mac OS 10.9 and above
- iMac/MacBook Pro/ MacBook Air/Mac Pro/Mac Mini late 2009 or later
- 4 GB RAM and more
- 512 MB Graphic RAM and more
- Noiseless CK can work as plug-in for Adobe Photoshop, Lightroom 4, 5 or later; Apple Aperture 3.2 or later, Photoshop Elements 10 -12 (App Store version is not supported due to Apple Sandboxing), Adobe Photoshop CS5, CS6 or CC (including Smart Object support).
