= Noiseware =

Image noise reduction software

Noiseware is an image noise reduction software by Imagenomic, available for Adobe Photoshop, Photoshop Elements, Apple Aperture, Microsoft Windows (stand-alone) and iOS. In addition to the paid Noiseware 5, an older version (2.6) is available as a free-to-use "Community Edition".

Noiseware is described as "self learning", meaning it improves with the number of images it sees, does not rely on camera profiles, and is not limited only to cameras known at the time of its release.

== Reviews ==
Michael Almond, in a review of 22 different noise reduction programs, notes, "Noiseware produces very natural-looking images, (ie. images, that look like they are actually noise-free, rather than processed to be noise-free)."
