= Connect360 =

Shareware application for Mac OS X

- Developer: Nullriver Software
- Release: 2006-02-09
- Stable release: 3.55
- Operating system: Mac OS X
- Type: Media Sharing
- License: Shareware
- Website: http://www.nullriver.com/

Connect360 is a shareware application for Mac OS X, developed by Nullriver Software. It was first released on February 9, 2006.

The application allows users to stream their iTunes music library, iPhoto photo library, and movies to their Xbox 360.

Although unable to support Apple's DRM protected media, recent updates to Connect360 support QuickTime's H.264, MPEG-4, DivX and Xvid video at a maximum resolution of 1080p.

== Reception ==
Connect360 received positive praise upon release. Macworld gave it a 4.5 out of 5, and specifically applauded how the software could make up for a lack of an Apple TV. TechRadar stated that Connect360 enabled the Xbox 360 to reach its full potential.
