= Neat Image =

Image noise reduction software

Neat Image is an image noise reduction software by ABSoft. It is available for Windows (stand alone, or Photoshop plugin), Mac OS X (stand alone or Aperture or Photoshop plugin) and Linux (stand alone).

== Reception ==
Ben Stafford from DigitalCameraReview.com writes that the "ease of use and great documentation [...] set this software apart from other noise reducing software", and Steve Caplin from ExpertReviews.co.uk gives it a 5/5 rating.
