= Keynote (presentation software) =

Apple-made presentation software

Keynote: Design Presentations

- Keynote 12.1 on macOS Big Sur
- Developer: Apple
- Release: January 7, 2003; 23 years ago
- Stable release: 15.4 / September 29, 2026; 31 days ago
- Operating system: macOS 15.6 or later; iOS 18.0 or later; iPadOS 18.0 or later; visionOS 2.0 or later
- Available in: 35 languages
- List of languages English, Arabic, Catalan, Croatian, Czech, Danish, Dutch, Finnish, French, German, Greek, Hebrew, Hindi, Hungarian, Indonesian, Italian, Japanese, Korean, Malay, Norwegian Bokmål, Polish, Portuguese, Romanian, Russian, Simplified Chinese, Slovak, Spanish, Swedish, Thai, Traditional Chinese, Turkish, Ukrainian, Vietnamese
- Type: Presentation
- License: Proprietary
- Website: apple.com/keynote

Keynote, officially Keynote: Design Presentations, is a presentation software application developed as a part of the iWork productivity suite by Apple. Version 15 of Keynote, the latest major update, was released in January 2026. Keynote is available for a range of Apple devices across macOS, iOS and iPadOS.

== History ==
Keynote began as a computer program for Apple CEO Steve Jobs to use in creating the presentations for Macworld Conference and Expo and other Apple keynote events. Before using Keynote, Jobs had used Concurrence, from Lighthouse Design, a similar product which ran on the NeXTSTEP and OPENSTEP platforms.

The program was first sold publicly as Keynote 1.0 in 2003, competing against existing presentation software, most notably Microsoft PowerPoint.

In 2005, Apple began selling Keynote 2.0 in conjunction with Pages, a new word processing and page layout application, in a software package called iWork. At the Macworld Conference & Expo 2006, Apple released iWork '06 with updated versions of Keynote 3.0 and Pages 2.0. In addition to official HD compatibility, Keynote 3 added new features, including group scaling, 3D charts, multi-column text boxes, auto bullets in any text field, image adjustments, and free-form masking tools. In addition, Keynote features three-dimensional transitions, such as a rotating cube or a simple flip of the slide.

In the fall of 2007, Apple released Keynote 4.0 in iWork '08, along with Pages 3.0 and the new Numbers spreadsheet application.

On October 23, 2013, Apple redesigned Keynote with version 6.0, and made it free for anyone with a new iOS device or a recently purchased Mac.

A version of Keynote for visionOS was released on February 2, 2024, alongside the launch of the Apple Vision Pro. The app is largely based upon the iPadOS version of the program, and is currently the only component of the iWork suite to offer a native visionOS app.

As part of the launch of Apple Creator Studio on January 28, 2026, version 15.1 of Keynote for macOS was released as a new app rather than an update to the existing app, which will no longer receive any new features. The iOS and iPadOS versions were unaffected by this and received the update as normal. As part of this, the application moved to a freemium model, with everything remaining free except for the newly added advanced editing features, which require an Apple Creator Studio subscription.

== Features ==
- Themes that allow the user to keep consistency in colors and fonts throughout the presentation, including charts, graphs, and tables.
- OpenGL-powered 3D slide transitions and builds that resemble rolling cubes or flipping pages, or dissolving transitions that fade one slide into the next.
- Dual monitor support: the presenter can show the presentation on a screen and still see the desktop or notes from their laptop or presenter screen.
- Exports to: PDF, QuickTime, JPEG, TIFF, PNG, HTML (with JPEG images) and PowerPoint. Keynote also uses .key (presentation files) and .kth (theme files) bundles based on XML.
- Supports all QuickTime video formats (including MPEG-2 and DV) in slideshows.
- Version 3 brings export to iDVD with clickability.
- Compatibility with Apple Remote and the Keynote remote application for iPhone, iPad, and iPod Touch.

== Keynote Remote ==
Keynote Remote was an iOS application that controlled Keynote presentations from an iPhone, iPod Touch or iPad over a Wi-Fi network or Bluetooth connection and was released through the App Store. Following the release of Keynote for iOS, the app was then integrated into the new Keynote application and the stand-alone app was withdrawn.

== Version history ==
Version number	Release date	Changes
1.0	January 7, 2003	Initial release.
1.1	June 4, 2003	Various enhancements to improve functionality and compatibility.
1.1.1	October 28, 2003	Improved stability and several user experience enhancements and much more user-friendly.
2.0	January 11, 2005	Released as part of the new iWork '05 package. Includes new transitions/animations, 20 new themes, new presenter tools, and improved export options, including export to Adobe Flash.
2.0.1	March 21, 2005	Addressed isolated issues that may have affected reliability.
2.0.2	May 25, 2005	Addressed isolated issues that may have affected reliability.
3.0	January 10, 2006	A new version was released as part of the iWork '06 package. Includes new transitions/animations, new themes, and graphics. Also compiled to run natively on both PowerPC and Intel processors as a universal binary.
3.0.1	April 4, 2006	This update to Keynote 3.0 addresses issues with three-dimensional charts and textures. It also addresses several other minor issues.
3.0.1v2	April 26, 2006	This update to Keynote 3.0 addresses issues with three-dimensional charts and textures. It also addresses a number of other minor issues. This update should be installed on all computers that share the user's Keynote 3.0 files, so that textures display properly.
3.0.2	September 28, 2006	This update is for Keynote 3.0.1 and addresses compatibility for accessing Aperture 1.5 content in Keynote.
4.0	August 7, 2007	A new version was released as part of the iWork '08 package. New text effects, new transitions, Instant Alpha, Smart Builds.
4.0.1	September 27, 2007	Addresses issues with builds and performance.
4.0.2	January 29, 2008	This update primarily addresses performance issues while playing or exporting presentations.
4.0.3	April 3, 2008	This update addresses performance and stability issues when working with large documents.
4.0.4	February 2, 2009	This update addresses compatibility issues with Microsoft Office PowerPoint 2007 and Microsoft Office PowerPoint 2008 as well as general compatibility issues.
5.0	January 6, 2009	Released as a part of the new iWork '09 package, it includes new chart animations, "Magic Move" and support for the Keynote Remote iPhone/iPod Touch application.
5.0.1	March 26, 2009	Improves reliability when deleting Keynote files, copying slides between presentations, or working with transitions and builds.
5.0.2	May 28, 2009	Improves reliability when saving documents and when playing presentations more than once per Keynote session.
5.0.3	September 28, 2009	Improves reliability with exporting to GarageBand, drag and drop, and animations.
5.0.4	September 2010	Fixes issues in Keynote.
5.0.5	January 5, 2011	Allows playback of Keynote presentations on iWork.com, with over 15 animations and effects, when using the latest version of Safari. Addresses an issue with the Drop transition, Dissolve build and shape colors. Addresses an issue with rulers. Adds support for Keynote Remote 1.2*, including high-resolution slides for the Retina display.
5.1	July 20, 2011	Adds support for OS X Lion, including Full-Screen, Resume, Auto Save, Versions, and Character picker. Improves Microsoft Office Compatibility. Adds new builds: Anvil and Fall Apart. Removes the ability to export movies with transparency.
5.1.1	December 1, 2011	Addresses issues that occur when working with large Keynote presentations on Mac OS X Lion and includes improvements in stability and accessibility.
5.2	July 25, 2012	Adds support for iCloud documents and dictation. Takes advantage of Retina displays.
5.3	December 4, 2012	Adds support for Keynote for iOS 6
6.0	October 22, 2013	Released as part of iWork for Mac which has been re-engineered from scratch, according to Apple, in 64-bit, and with iCloud syncing capability. Many features were removed.
6.0.1	November 21, 2013	Customize the toolbar with the most important tools. Stability improvements and bug fixes.
6.1	January 23, 2014	Added new transitions, display options, and improved compatibility with Microsoft PowerPoint.
6.2	April 1, 2014	Improved Presenter Display layouts and labels. Added new transitions and builds Object Revolve, Drift and Scale, and Skid. Improved Magic Move, including text morphing. Motion blurs can now be applied to animations. The release includes various other fixes and usability improvements.
6.5	October 16, 2014	Updated design for OS X Yosemite, added support for iCloud Drive and Handoff with iOS 8, and updated file format to improve support for third-party online services. Allows customization of the presenter display layout, includes a new Trace animation and contains several improvements for editing presentations.
6.6	October 15, 2015	Updated for OS X El Capitan
6.6.1	November 11, 2015	Bug fixes
6.6.2	May 10, 2016	This update contains stability improvements and bug fixes.
7.0	September 2016	Updated for macOS Sierra, introduced Collaboration (Beta), added Keynote Live support, added tabbing support to use multiple presentations in one window and introduced backward compatibility for Keynote '05 presentations.
7.0.5	October 27, 2016	Bug fixes
7.1	March 27, 2017	New "Object List" sidebar with an ordered list of slide objects, Keynote 1.0 compatibility, Touch ID support, and export of presentations to compatible websites.
7.1.1	April 26, 2017	This update contains stability improvements and bug fixes.
7.2	June 13, 2017	"Shapes Library" with new built-in shapes and support for custom user shapes, comment replies, new "Auto-Correction" preferences pane, and an option to disable "Auto-Center" while editing a slide.
7.3	September 19, 2017	"Object List" filtering, performance, and stability improvements.
7.3.1	November 2, 2017	Improved overall stability and performance.
8.0	March 27, 2018	Collaborate in real time on presentations stored in Box (Requires macOS High Sierra). Use donut charts to visualize data. Add an interactive image gallery to view a collection of photos. Enhance presentations with a variety of new editable shapes. Additional options for reducing the file size of presentations.
8.0.1	May 3, 2018	Stability and performance improvements.
8.1	June 18, 2018	Support for mathematical equations (LaTeX, MathML), a new look for charts (rounded corners), and new editable shapes. Also improved compatibility with Microsoft PowerPoint and for Arabic and Hebrew languages.
8.2	September 13, 2018	Support for Dark Mode, Continuity Camera and Audio Recording.
8.3	October 18, 2018	Stability and performance improvements.
9.01	April 3, 2019	Stability and performance improvements. Animated GIFs, Sync shapes, Sync themes
9.02	May 8, 2019	Fixes issue that caused closed captions for videos to fail to play during a slideshow
9.1	June 25, 2019	Style text by filling it with gradients or images or by applying new outline styles. Place images, shapes, and equations inline in text boxes so they move with the text. Edit master slides while collaborating on a presentation. Using face detection, subjects in photos are intelligently positioned in placeholders and objects.
10.0	March 31, 2020	New themes (Select from a variety of new themes). Cloud Drive folder sharing: Add a Keynote presentation to a shared iCloud Drive folder to automatically start collaborating. (Requires macOS 10.15.4). Edit shared presentations offline: Edit shared presentations while offline and the changes will upload when the user is back online. Easily access the recently used themes in a redesigned theme chooser. Print or export a PDF of the presentation with comments included. Add a drop cap to make the text stand out with a large, decorative first letter. Enhance presentations with a variety of new, editable shapes.
10.1	July 9, 2020	The presentation can play in windowed mode, allowing users to switch applications without interruption. Videos can now play across slides through transitions. Move-along-path animation now allows objects to align to the path during animation.
10.2	September 22, 2020	Added support for web video from YouTube and Vimeo within slides. Added more editable shapes and video export options.
10.3.5	November 12, 2020	Updated UI to be consistent with macOS Big Sur.
10.3.8	December 1, 2020	Stability and performance improvements.
10.3.9	January 14, 2021	Stability and performance improvements.
11.0	March 23, 2021	Presenter notes now support windowed mode. Added thumbnails in the build order window for editing complex sequences.
12.0	April 7, 2022	Added Shortcuts support on macOS Monterey. Updated icon for iOS and iPadOS.
12.1	June 21, 2022	Dynamic backgrounds that move continuously as Keynote transitions from slide to slide. Ability to skip or unskip all slides in a collapsed group.
12.2	October 25, 2022	Added activity view showing recent changes in collaborative documents. Share and see changes to a collaborative document in Messages (requires iOS 16, iPadOS 16 or macOS Ventura). Automatically remove an image's background to isolate its subject (requires iOS 16, iPadOS 16 or macOS Ventura).
13.0	March 30, 2023	Supports exporting and sending a document in a different format from the Share menu. Keynote Live presentations can only be viewed in a web browser. Adds support for Apple Pencil hover on compatible iPads.
14.0	April 2, 2024	Add a new look to slides with the Dynamic Colour, Minimalist Light and Minimalist Dark themes. Streamlined in-app notifications inform the user when a person joins a collaborative presentation for the first time. Preserve file format and full quality when adding HEIC photos taken on iPhone or iPad. Hold the Command key to select non-contiguous words, sentences or paragraphs. Improved compatibility for slide transitions when importing and exporting Microsoft PowerPoint files. Additional stability and performance improvements.
14.1	June 10, 2024	Get inline predictions that complete the word or phrase the user typing. Control where the presenter display appears when rehearsing a presentation with multiple displays connected.
14.2	September 17, 2024	Enabled devices running macOS Sequoia to display HDR images and videos with a greater dynamic range and share presentations automatically during FaceTime calls. Also provided general bug fixes and improvements.
14.3	December 12, 2024	Implemented Apple Intelligence features on compatible devices, enabling users to leverage AI for quick answers to questions using ChatGPT, image generation using Image Playground, and text manipulation using Writing Tools.
14.4	April 3, 2025	Writing Tools now modify the document directly, giving users the opportunity to see how the result appears alongside other content before accepting or rejecting the changes. Improved compatibility with PowerPoint by allowing Shortcuts to now export Keynote presentations in PowerPoint format. Improved compatibility of copied and pasted objects between Keynote and Freeform.
14.5	January 28, 2026	Bug fixes and performance improvements (macOS only)
15.1	January 28, 2026	Now part of Apple Creator Studio. Adds a number of features exclusive to Apple Creator Studio subscribers: new professionally-designed templates; high-quality photos and graphics, as well as new Apple-curated content in the Content Hub; create and edit images in a document and restyle with AI; increase clarity and detail of images with Super Resolution; transform a text outline into a first draft of slides for a presentation; automatically generate presenter notes based on context; clean up slide layout, spacing, alignment, and typography; and collaborate with larger files shared on iCloud. New design with Liquid Glass. Adds new editable shapes. Optimized for the new menu bar in iPadOS 26.

== See also ==
- Microsoft PowerPoint
- Google Slides
- OpenOffice.org Impress
- Pages (word processor), another iWork application
- Numbers (spreadsheet), another iWork application
- Prezi
- Stevenote
