= IMovie =

Video editing software developed by Apple

iMovie

- iMovie 10.1.12 running on macOS Mojave
- Developer: Apple
- Release: October 5, 1999; 27 years ago
- Stable release: 10.4.6 / November 18, 2026; 1 day ago
- Operating system: macOS 14.6 or later
- Type: Video editing software
- License: Proprietary
- Website: www.apple.com/imovie/

iMovie is a freeware video editing application made by Apple for the Mac, the iPhone, and the iPad. It includes a range of video effects and tools like color correction and image stabilization, but is designed to be accessible to users with little or no video editing experience. iMovie's professional equivalent is Apple's Final Cut Pro.

iMovie was originally released in 1999 for Mac OS 8, and bundled with the iMac DV. With version 3, iMovie became part of Apple's now-defunct iLife suite, alongside other multimedia apps. iMovie '08 was a complete rewrite, and lacked many of the features of previous versions, which returned in iMovie '09 and iMovie '11. The iOS version of iMovie came out in 2010.

iMovie is pre-installed on all new Macs, iPhones, and iPads, and is free on the App Store.

== History ==
=== iMovie (1999) ===
The first version of iMovie was released in 1999 as a Mac OS 8 application bundled with the first FireWire-enabled consumer Mac model, the iMac DV. Both iMovie and the iMac DV were announced at Apple's special event on October 5, 1999 at the Flint Center.

=== iMovie 2 (2000) ===
iMovie 2 added the ability to interleave video and audio tracks on the timeline.

=== iMovie 3 (2003) ===
iMovie 3 was plagued by performance issues and bugs.

=== iMovie 4 (2004) ===
iMovie 4 introduced nondestructive video editing. In prior versions of iMovie, trimming a clip removed the trimmed portion permanently. Beginning in version 4, iMovie introduced Direct Trimming, implementing editing functionality closer to professional-grade editing software.

=== iMovie HD 5 (2005) ===
A blank movie project in iMovie HD, included with iLife '05

Beginning with version 5, iMovie was renamed to iMovie HD, to highlight its new support for HDV (720p and 1080i) camcorders. It gained features to integrate it with the rest of the iLife suite, with toolbox buttons allowing the importing of images from iPhoto, music from iTunes and the setting of chapter markers ready for exporting to iDVD. iMovie HD 5 imported MJPEG files as DV by default, which introduces noise; MJPEG files are cryptically lumped with "iSight" files in this version.

It gained the "Magic iMovie" feature, which attempted to automate the whole process of video editing, by allowing a common transition to be added between scenes, a music track to be synchronised with the video and a DVD to be created with the accompanying iDVD software.

Later versions added support for footage from AVCHD camcorders, and H.264-compressed video from MPEG-4 or QuickTime File Format files (.mov), as generated by a number of digital photo cameras with HD video recording feature. To facilitate this, iMovie includes the Apple Intermediate Codec on the system as a QuickTime component. iMovie transcodes HD video upon import using this codec and stores it in the QuickTime file format.

=== iMovie HD 6 (2006) ===
iMovie 6 was released in January 2006 as part of the iLife '06 suite, and was also originally optionally included with iLife '08 as a substitution for iMovie '08 (due to the new version's incompatibility with older Power PC Macintosh computers). However, this option was removed after iLife '09 was released. It was integrated with iPhoto, iTunes, iDVD, GarageBand and iWeb. iMovie HD 6 was designed for ease of use, and included new themes. Themes allow the user to drop movie clips or photos into professionally designed backdrops. Each theme included full-motion graphic bumpers and transitions. iMovie HD 6 also added real-time effects, which took advantage of the computer's graphics processing unit to perform some effects without rendering. It also introduced real-time titling, enhanced audio tools and effects, the ability to have multiple projects open at once, video podcasts and blogs (using integration with iWeb), and a refined look based on iTunes 5 and 6.

=== iMovie '08 (2007) ===
iMovie '08 (version 7.0) was released in August 2007 as a part of the iLife '08 suite. iMovie '08 was a complete redesign and rewrite of iMovie. It had much better HD output, and more formats to convert to. This was limited, however, by an undocumented restriction on supported codecs. iPhoto uses the QuickTime library and can create thumbnails for all QuickTime supported formats, but most of these cannot be used by iMovie '08. Some of the formats that iMovie '08 was able to import will not be recognized when they are added to an iPhoto library. Motion JPEG-encoded AVI files were recognized, and were the most common format used by digital cameras. A new feature called "skimming" for quickly previewing video in the library at a user controlled speed was added, and so was a feature that allows the user to highlight parts of video clips just like highlighting text. iMovie 08 also had the ability to add more than two layers of background sound, including multiple music, narration and sounds; previous versions could play multiple tracks but could display only two extra audio tracks. It included more exportation formats, including iPhone-sized video. It also supported non-tape-based HD video, such as AVCHD and footage from DVD and HDD camcorders. iMovie '08 also had the ability to export movies to the YouTube video sharing website.

iMovie 08 was criticized due to its drastic abandonment of some iMovie HD 6 features. Former New York Times reviewer David Pogue said "iMovie '08 is an utter bafflement... incapable of the more sophisticated editing that the old iMovie made so enjoyable...All visual effects are gone — even basic options like slow motion, reverse motion, fast motion, and black-and-white. And you can't have more than one project open at a time." Features removed included the classic timeline, the ability to create DVD chapter markers, support for plugins, and in-timeline audio adjustment and control. iMovie '08 imported a much more limited set of video codecs and metadata formats than previous versions of iMovie or the then-current version QuickTime Player. For example, QuickTime Player could be extended to support the FLIP Video 3ivx MPEG-4 codec, but iMovie '08 could not. iMovie '08 also removed the ability to import DV footage. As a result, all resulting videos had lossy compression applied and there was no facility for managing full format video. The peculiar lack of QuickTime support means QuickTime Pro could edit a larger range of video than iMovie '08.

Apple released iMovie HD 6 as a free download to those who had purchased iMovie '08. However, in response to the release of the subsequent newer version of iMovie '09, Apple removed the download in late January 2009 while also reducing the $299 price tag for Final Cut Express to $199. Several of the features removed from iMovie '08 that were previously included with iMovie HD 6 have been restored into iMovie '09 and, more recently, iMovie '11.

=== iMovie '09 (2009) ===
iMovie '09 (version 8.0) was released in January 2009 as part of the iLife '09 package. It introduced some new features and restored some features from previous versions of iMovie, including basic video effects (such as fast/slow motion and aged film) and image stabilization as well as travel map functions for marking locations where a video was shot. iMovie '09 also introduced simple implementations of more advanced features such as picture-in-picture and Chroma keying. It also improved editing with a precision cut editor and a clip trimmer, improved support for hard drive-based cameras such as the Flip Mino, added some new titles and transitions, and added full iDVD support (which was unavailable in iMovie '08). In addition, it introduced a Full-Screen Library Browser with which the user can find and examine all of his or her video in one place.

=== iMovie '11 (2010) ===
iMovie '11 (version 9.0) was released on October 20, 2010, as part of the iLife '11 package. It has the ability to make trailers for home movies, more control over audio, instant replay and flash and hold effects, facial recognition, news themes, and the ability to watch the video on a Mac, iPad, iPhone/iPod touch, or Apple TV, as well as sharing on Facebook and YouTube. It now supports the AVCHD Lite format.

Apple worked with Abbey Road Studios in London, England, to bring original music/film scores to iMovie '11. The music is most notably used in the "trailers" feature provided by the software.

On January 6, 2011, Apple made iMovie '11 (along with Aperture, the iWork suite, and the rest of the iLife suite) available on the newly-released Mac App Store. Reviewing the release for Macworld, Jeff Carlson called it a substantial update worthy of a 4.5-out-of-5 mice rating, while noting it uncovered several features not mentioned in Apple's own marketing and pointing out some ongoing shortcomings.

Prior versions of iMovie had the ability to split an event so that the unwanted portion of a long event could be deleted in order to save memory. This feature was removed in iMovie '11 and is no longer available in iMovie or Final Cut Pro X (FCPX), but in FCPX, all but the desired part of a project can be cut out as a workaround, export that project in ProRes 422 format, and then import that export. This can be used as a smaller source clip instead of the original larger one.

=== iMovie 10.x (2013–present) ===
iMovie 10.0 was released on October 22, 2013, by Apple Inc. This version of iMovie was a complete redesign with more options to share a movie, more movie and trailer theme options from iMovie for iOS, easier to make picture-in-pictures, cutaways, side-by-sides etc., more realistic green-screen effects and easier refinements. Because it was not compatible with projects created with iMovie 9, upgrading to iMovie 10 did not replace the earlier version, but instead moved it to a folder where it could still be used.

iMovie 10.1 was released on October 13, 2015. It added support for 4K video editing and included a major user interface overhaul, as well as the removal of some peripheral features. Later updates to iMovie 10.1 fixed bugs and made incremental changes. Versions 10.1.12 and 10.1.16 work on macOS Catalina 10.15.7.

iMovie 10.2, released on November 12, 2020, became natively compatible with Apple silicon Macs, and added new backgrounds. Versions 10.2.3 and 10.2.5 work on macOS Catalina 10.15.7.

iMovie 10.3 and later updates added support for Cinematic Mode, Magic Movie and Storyboard, and made performance improvements. Versions 10.3 and above require macOS 11 Big Sur.

iMovie 10.4 was released on November 13, 2024, and improved on stability and performance features. Versions 10.4 and above require macOS Sonoma 14.6 or later, 4 gigabytes of RAM, and 4.6 gigabytes of disk space.

== Features and capabilities ==
iMovie includes options to modify and enhance video color settings, crop and rotate of a video clip, stabilize shaky videos, add video transitions (such as fade, doorway, slide, swap, mosaic, cube, and page curls), and changing the speed (speed up or slow down) of clips. There are multi-clip video effects, such as creating a cutaway, using a green/blue screen to cut out a subject and replace the background with a different clip, creating a split-screen, and picture-in-picture effect.

iMovie contains a large number of built-in sound effects, and also has the ability to record a voiceover or add a music soundtrack. It also has the ability to manipulate and enhance the audio of a project by reducing background noise and boosting audio levels of quiet clips.

iMovie projects can export finished movies or clips to QuickTime file format (.mp4), or export single frames as JPEGs.

With iMovie having versions on Apple's mobile and desktop operating systems Apple introduced a feature which allowed users to import iMovie projects from iOS to macOS. Similarly, if a project ends up requiring more advanced editing than iMovie can provide, iMovie projects can be imported in Final Cut Pro.

=== Use cases ===
==== Trailers ====
iMovie allows for the creation of movie trailers through included templates. The trailers feature in iMovie allows for clips to be easily dropped into the timeline which consists of storyboard panes which have a label that lists which type of clip should be placed in each pane. The template also includes an outline for adding titles and credits to the trailer.

==== App previews ====
iMovie can be used to create app previews for use in Apple's App Store. App previews allow developers to give users a brief overview of an app through video rather than images.

== Supported media formats ==
Media formats compatible with versions of macOS after macOS Mojave
Video formats	Still-image formats	Audio formats	Container formats
Apple Animation Codec	BMP	AAC	3GP
Apple Intermediate Codec	GIF	AIFF	AVI
Apple ProRes	HEIF	BWF	M4V
AVCHD (including AVCCAM, AVCHD Lite, and NXCAM)	JPEG	CAF	MOV (QuickTime)
DV (including DVCAM, DVCPRO, and DVCPRO50)	PNG	MP3	MP4
H.264	PSD	MP4	
HDV	RAW	RF64	
HEVC	TGA	WAV	
iFrame	TIFF		
Motion JPEG (OpenDML only)			
MPEG-4 SP			
XAVC-S			

macOS Mojave is the last version of macOS to offer built-in compatibility with many older media codecs, including RealVideo, DivX, Sorenson 3, and FlashPix. Support for these codecs had been implemented in 32-bit macOS components, which Apple did not update to 64-bit, and removed entirely in macOS Catalina. In March 2019, seven months before Catalina's release, Apple released an iMovie update that notified users about the change, and automatically converted these older formats to newer codecs.

== iOS and iPadOS version ==
iMovie (iOS and iPadOS)
- Developer: Apple Inc.
- Release: June 23, 2010; 16 years ago
- Stable release: 3.0.1 / October 24, 2022; 4 years ago
- Operating system: iOS 16, iPadOS 16
- Type: Video editing software
- License: Proprietary
- Website: www.apple.com/ios/imovie/

At WWDC 2010, Steve Jobs announced that iMovie would be released on iOS later that month, with the basic features of the Mac version. The first iPhone version was released on June 23, 2010 and was only compatible with the simultaneously-released iPhone 4, the first iPhone that could record HD video. It was released for the iPad on March 11, 2011, to coincide with the release of the iPad 2.

iMovie gained support for 4K resolution in version 2.2, switched to using the Metal graphics API in version 2.2.5, external displays in version 2.2.6, and green screen effects in version 2.2.7.

iMovie 3, released in April 2022, gained pre-made templates, called Storyboards, to simplify the movie creation process, and the Magic Movie feature, which automatically adds transitions to clips and combines them into a finished video.

== See also ==
- Comparison of video editing software
