= ILife =

Discontinued software suite for macOS and iOS

iLife
- Developer: Apple
- Release: January 7, 2003; 23 years ago
- Operating system: iOS & macOS
- Platform: ARM & Intel (iLife v1-'09 compatible with PPC)
- Size: 4 GB
- License: Proprietary
- Website: Homepage at the Wayback Machine (archived January 16, 2009)

iLife is a discontinued software suite for macOS and iOS developed by Apple. It consists of various programs for media creation, organization, editing and publishing. At various times, it included: iTunes, iMovie, iPhoto, iDVD, iWeb, and GarageBand. Only iMovie and GarageBand remain and are now freely available on Apple's Mac App Store. iDVD and iWeb have been discontinued while iTunes and iPhoto have been succeeded by Music and Photos respectively.

iLife was preinstalled on new Mac computers and was previously also sold as a bundle on DVD. With the introduction of the Mac App Store, Apple discontinued the DVD bundle and turned to selling the apps separately. Photos, the app that superseded iPhoto, is now an essential part of macOS, while iMovie and GarageBand, although they ship pre-installed on any new Mac computer or iOS device, can be uninstalled if not needed. Updates for iLife apps purchased on the Mac App Store are available for free, while the pre-App Store model required buying the entire suite when a new version had been released.

== Origins ==
iMovie has the longest legacy of the applications included with iLife. It was marketed by Apple as an easy-to-use video editing application that allowed novice users to quickly create professional-quality movies. The first version of the software was released in October 1999 and bundled with the iMac DV. On April 28, 2000, Apple began allowing users to download iMovie free of charge from its website. iMovie remained free until 2003, when it became part of the first iLife release, which was sold for $49. Apple continued to update and develop the existing iMovie software until the release of iLife '08 in 2007, when a new version, iMovie '08, was released. iMovie '08 was completely rewritten as a new application and introduced significant changes to the user interface.

iPhoto was the second application in iLife that began as a free application available for download from Apple's website. The first version of iPhoto was announced at the Macworld Conference & Expo January 3, 2002, and released January 7, 2002. It was billed as being the "missing link" in photography. In addition to allowing users to import, organize, and perform basic edits on their photos, iPhoto also let users print photos in a variety of ways, including as a bound book. Subsequent versions of iPhoto have added a number of features, including automatic organization by events, faces (using facial recognition technology), and places. iPhoto also includes a full-screen editing mode and a feature called "Photocasting" (a way to share photos with others directly from within iPhoto).

iDVD was first announced on January 9, 2001. It was bundled with the Power Mac G4, the first Mac model with a SuperDrive that could read and write both CDs and DVDs. The first version of iDVD introduced a simple way to design customized DVDs with menus, backdrops, slideshows and home movies that could be played back on most DVD players. iDVD was never released as a download. Instead, it was bundled with the first version of iLife, released in 2003.

The remaining two applications in the iLife suite were first introduced as part of iLife '04 and iLife '06, respectively. Released in 2004, the first version of GarageBand was designed as an easy way for both beginner and advanced musicians to create and edit music on their computers. iWeb was introduced at the Macworld Conference & Expo on January 10, 2006 and was promoted as a way for Mac users to create their own professionally designed websites without having to know or write HTML or any other code. The last version of iWeb was released with iLife '11.

On January 6, 2011, iLife '11 was made available to purchase on the Mac App Store. From October 22, 2013, iLife '13 was made available for free download on the Mac App Store.

After iPhoto was discontinued in 2015, newest versions of GarageBand and iMovie, the only remaining components of iLife suite, became distributed separately on the Mac App Store, making iLife suite itself discontinued.

== Releases and history ==
Version	Introduction	Cost	Minimum MacOS	Binary	iPhoto	iTunes	iMovie	iDVD	GarageBand	iWeb
iLife	Macworld Conference & Expo on January 7, 2003	$49	10.1.5	PowerPC	2	3	3	3	–	–
iLife '04	Macworld Conference & Expo on January 6, 2004	$49	10.2.6 (10.2.8 recommended)	PowerPC	4	4.2	4	4	1	–
iLife '05	Macworld Conference & Expo on January 11, 2005	$79	10.3.4 (10.3.6 to use HD features of iMovie HD, and to work with RAW photos in iPhoto 5)	PowerPC	5	4.7.1	HD 5	5	2	–
iLife '06	Macworld Conference & Expo on January 10, 2006	$79	10.4.3 (10.4.4 required for iMovie HD themes, iPhoto photocasts, and iChat recording in GarageBand)	Universal	6	6.0.2	HD 6	6	3	1
iLife '08	Special Summer event on August 7, 2007	$79	10.4.9	Universal	7.0	7.3	7.0 (HD 6)	7.0	4.0	2.0
iLife '09	Macworld Conference & Expo on January 6, 2009 (Press Release)	$79	10.5.6	Universal	8.0	8.0.1	8.0	7.0.3	5.0	3.0
iLife '11 (retail DVD)	Apple Special Event on October 20, 2010 (Press Release)	$49	10.6.3	Intel	9.0	–	9.0	7.1	6.0	3.0.2
iLife '11 (Mac App Store build)	Mac App Store launch on January 6, 2011 (Press Release)	$15 per iLife app, $20 per iWork app	10.6.6	Intel	9.1	–	9.0.9	–	6.0.5	–
iLife '13 10.0	Apple Special Event on October 22, 2013	Free $15 per iLife app, $20 per iWork app	10.9.0	Intel	9.5	–	10.0	–	10.0	–

Notes about specific releases:

- iLife '06: This was the last release to include iTunes. It now comes with every Mac computer and account, as well as every Apple device (i.e. iPhone, iPod Touch, iPad, Apple TV).
- iLife '08: This release included a completely reprogrammed iMovie with a new user interface which omitted some of the features of the previous version. In response to criticism, Apple released iMovie HD 6 as a free download to anyone who purchased this version of iLife.
- iLife '09: With this release of iLife the free download of iMovie HD 6 was discontinued.
- iLife '11: PowerPC Macs are not compatible with iLife '11. Although iLife '11 originally supported Snow Leopard, the latest updates to iPhoto 9 and iMovie 9 require Yosemite, and GarageBand requires Mavericks.

== Current components ==
=== iMovie ===
iMovie is a digital video editor. The process of film capture by a digital camera via FireWire is automated, with iMovie allowing users to split up their videos, add titles and special effects, and reorganize them into movies. It is also compatible with MPEG 4 cameras, AVCHD camcorders, HDV cameras, and Apple's iSight webcams. Photographs may also be used, and a soundtrack may be added using tracks from the user's iTunes music library. These can then be exported into a variety of viewable formats, including the .mov format used by Apple's QuickTime Player.

=== GarageBand ===
GarageBand is a music and podcast creation application that includes over 1,000 pre-recorded audio loops for use in projects. The program also supports software instruments and importation from real instruments, such as guitars and keyboards.

== Discontinued components ==
=== iPhoto ===
iPhoto was an application that allowed users to store, view, edit, and share their digital photos. Users could organize their photos in a number of ways. Events automatically grouped photos taken around the same time. Faces uses facial recognition to identify photos containing faces, which can then be tagged by users and sorted according to who is in the photo. Places takes advantage of geotagging technology. Many cameras today embed metadata into their digital photos containing information about the location where the photo was taken. Places allowed users to browse and see their photos on a map. iPhoto included tools to crop photos, reduce red-eye, add effects such as sepia and black and white, and to adjust the exposure, saturation, contrast and black and white balance of photos. In addition, users could have their photos printed, create books (hard bound copies of which can be ordered), calendars and greetings cards. As of April 8, 2015, Apple discontinued and removed iPhoto from the Mac App Store with the release of the new Photos app bundled with OS X Yosemite 10.10.3. As of 2017, iPhoto was unable to sync with iCloud but Photos can.

=== iDVD ===
iDVD, integrated with iMovie, allows the burning of movies onto a DVD and the user to customize their DVD with custom menus based on themes (many of which make use of the content of the movies) and custom chapter points. It contains the MPEG-2 encoder functionality needed to produce DVD-compatible content. Each new version added more menu themes. In iLife '09 and iLife '11, iDVD was not updated (with the exception of a few bug fixes). There is no support for Blu-ray disc burning in the current version of iDVD. As of July 20, 2011, Apple discontinued iDVD and it is neither included with new Apple computers nor for sale.

=== iWeb ===
iWeb, released at the Macworld Conference & Expo on January 10, 2006, provided the ability to easily turn content from the other iLife applications into websites using Apple-designed templates with one-click uploading to Apple's MobileMe sharing service. iWeb also allowed users to create links to their own podcasts and photocasts from the webpage. iWeb was the latest addition to the iLife suite when it was discontinued in June 2011. As of July 20, 2011, Apple discontinued iWeb and it is no longer included with new Apple computers nor for sale.

=== MobileMe Web Gallery ===
MobileMe Web Gallery was a feature designed for easy photo sharing from directly within the iLife suite. It allowed users to create events or photo albums using the Web Gallery feature of their MobileMe account, and permitted visitors to a user's Gallery to view the photos. As of July 1, 2012 MobileMe and its Gallery was discontinued.

== See also ==
- iWork – Apple-exclusive productivity suite
- MobileMe – a former online service integrated with some iLife features
- Windows Live
- List of Macintosh software
