= Photos (Apple) =

Digital photograph manipulation app by Apple

- Photos app running in macOS Tahoe
- Developer: Apple
- Operating system: iOS (all versions); iPadOS (all versions); OS X 10.10.3 onward; watchOS (all versions); tvOS 10 onward; visionOS (all versions)
- Type: Photo gallery and editing software
- Website: https://www.icloud.com/photos

Photos is a photo management and editing application developed by Apple. It was released as a bundled app in iPhone OS 1, and released as a bundled app to OS X Yosemite users in the 10.10.3 update on April 8, 2015, replacing iPhoto and Aperture. It was released for tvOS 10 on September 13, 2016. With the introduction of the Apple Vision Pro at WWDC 2023 on June 5, 2023, the Photos app came to visionOS.

== History ==
In June 2014, Apple announced its plan to discontinue the applications iPhoto and Aperture, to be replaced by a new application, Photos, in 2015. The app was included with OS X Yosemite 10.10.3, released as a free update to users on April 8, 2015.

On September 13, 2016, the app was later included in tvOS 10.

With the introduction of the Apple Vision Pro on the WWDC 2023 on June 5, 2023, the Photos app came to visionOS.

With iOS 18 and iPadOS 18, the Photos app received a comprehensive redesign at WWDC 2024, marking its biggest feature update since its introduction. The goal of the redesign was to improve usability, simplify library organization, and provide new AI-powered features. The previous structure with separate tabs such as “Library,” “Albums,” and “For You” was replaced by a unified, scrollable view. When users open the app, they first see their entire library in a compact grid. As they scroll further, automatically generated collections appear, organized thematically by people, pets, locations, or events. These collections can be individually customized, sorted, or pinned. The search function has been significantly improved and now supports natural language input, such as “Me with ice cream” or “Cat in a box.” Both photos and videos are searched, with specific scenes within videos being identifiable. Because of the integration with Apple Intelligence, enhanced editing tools are available. These include a new “Clean Up” tool that removes distracting objects from images, as well as a feature that automatically creates memories from photos and videos based on simple descriptive text.

== Features ==
Photos is intended to be less complex than its professional predecessor, Aperture. Through version 4.0 (released with macOS 10.14 Mojave) the Photos app organized photos by "moment", as determined using combination of the time and location metadata attached to the photo. Starting in version 5.0 (released in 2019 with macOS 10.15 Catalina), photos can instead be browsed by year, month, or day.

=== Photo format ===
By default, iPhones save photos in the HEIF (High Efficiency Image File) format, which is a space-saving format with a .heic file extension. HEIF offers smaller file sizes and high quality, whereas JPEG provides wider compatibility with older devices and software. HEIF photos can be exported as JPEG files.

=== Editing ===
Photos includes robust editing functions that are utilized with simple controls, such as a one-click auto-enhance button.

=== iCloud Photo Library ===
iCloud Photo Library is heavily integrated into the app, keeping photos and videos in sync with various Apple devices designated by the user (such as Macs, iPhones, and iPads), including edits and album structures. iCloud integration is still optional, but it is much more central to Photos as compared to iPhoto.

=== Professional printing ===
Like its predecessors, Photos initially included a number of options for professional printing of photos, which could then optionally be turned into books or calendars and mailed to an address. With Photos, Apple added new types of prints, including square sizes and the ability to print panoramas. In July 2018, Apple announced, via a pop-up message in Photos, that they would be discontinuing these services, adding that users should submit any final orders by September 30, 2018.

=== Sharing ===
iCloud Photo Sharing allows sharing photos with others. Others can view, like or comment existing shared photos or contribute new photos to the shared album. Other ways of sharing include e-mail, social platform that integrates through iOS Extensions, or Apple's peer-to-peer AirDrop technology.

== Criticism ==
Critics noted the loss of functionality in Photos as compared to its predecessors. For example, images could no longer be ordered as Events but were either automatically ordered chronologically into Moments or had to be put into albums. The latter did not allow for automatic sorting and it was necessary to configure Smart Albums with customized user-defined rules to do so. Customers who had been using the Aperture application, abandoned by Apple on the release of Photos, were particularly angry about loss of professional-standard functionality. Apple customers who upgraded to OS X 10.11 El Capitan, which was launched in 2015, found that if they had not first obtained the most recent version of iPhoto before upgrading, they were locked out of the application without warning. Since iPhoto had been removed from the Mac App Store, they had no alternative but to use Photos.

== See also ==
- Google Photos
- darktable
- gThumb
