= GarageBand =

Digital audio workstations for macOS, iOS, and iPadOS

- GarageBand 10.4.1 on macOS Big Sur
- Developer: Apple
- Release: January 6, 2004; 22 years ago
- Stable release: 10.4.13 / December 16, 2025; 11 months ago}
- Operating system: macOS (15.6 or later)
- Available in: 31 languages
- List of languages English, Catalan, Croatian, Czech, Danish, Dutch, Finnish, French, German, Greek, Hindi, Hungarian, Indonesian, Italian, Japanese, Korean, Malay, Norwegian Bokmål, Polish, Portuguese, Romanian, Russian, Simplified Chinese, Slovak, Spanish, Swedish, Thai, Traditional Chinese, Turkish, Ukrainian, Vietnamese
- Type: Digital audio workstation
- License: Proprietary
- Website: apple.com/garageband

GarageBand is a digital audio workstation software application by Apple for macOS, iPadOS, and iOS devices that allows users to create music or podcasts. It is a lighter, amateur-oriented offshoot of the more professional-oriented Logic Pro. GarageBand was originally released for macOS in 2004 and brought to iOS in 2011. The app's music and podcast creation system enables users to create multiple tracks with software synthesizer presets (to be played on a MIDI keyboard and/or sequenced on a piano roll), pre-made and user-created loops, an array of various effects, and voice recordings.

== GarageBand on Mac ==
=== History ===
GarageBand was developed by Apple under the direction of Gerhard Lengeling. Lengeling was formerly from the German company Emagic, makers of Logic Audio (later renamed Logic Pro). Apple acquired Emagic in July 2002. It developed GarageBand as a lighter version of Logic Pro (with the intermediate application Logic Express offered for a brief period), and each version of GarageBand resembles the current version of Logic aesthetically in addition to featuring its audio engine.

Steve Jobs announced the application in his keynote speech at the Macworld Conference & Expo in San Francisco on January 6, 2004. Musician John Mayer assisted with its demonstration. It is part of the iLife '04 package.

Apple announced GarageBand 2 at the 2005 Macworld Conference & Expo on January 11, 2005. It shipped, as announced, around January 22, 2005. Notable new features included the abilities to view and edit music in musical notation. It was also possible to record up to eight tracks at once and to fix timing and pitch of recordings. Apple added automation of track pan position and the master pitch. Transposition of both audio and MIDI has been added by Apple along with the ability to import MIDI files. It is part of iLife '05.

GarageBand 3, announced at 2006's Macworld Conference & Expo, includes a 'podcast studio', including the ability to use more than 200 effects and jingles, and integration with iChat for remote interviews. It is part of iLife '06.

GarageBand 4, also known as GarageBand '08, is part of iLife '08. It incorporates the ability to record sections of a song separately, such as bridges and chorus lines. Additionally, it provides support for the automation of tempos and instruments, the creation, and exportation of iPhone ringtones, and a "Magic GarageBand" feature which includes a virtual jam session with a complete 3D view of the Electric instruments.

GarageBand 5 is part of the iLife '09 package. It includes music instruction and allows the user to buy instructional videos by contemporary artists. It also contains new features for electric guitar players, including a dedicated 3D Electric Guitar Track containing a virtual stomp box pedalboard, and virtual amplifiers with spring reverb and tremolo. GarageBand 5 also includes a redesigned user interface as well as Project Templates.

GarageBand 6, also known as GarageBand '11, is part of the iLife '11 package, which Apple released on October 20, 2010. This version brings new features such as Flex Time, a tool to adjust the rhythm of a recording. It also includes the ability to match the tempo of one track with another instantly, additional guitar amps and stomp boxes, 22 new lessons for guitar and piano, and "How Did I Play?", a tool to measure the accuracy and progress of a piano or guitar performance in a lesson.

Apple released GarageBand 10 along with OS X 10.9 Mavericks in October 2013. This version has lost Magic GarageBand and the podcast functionality.

Apple updated GarageBand 10 for Mac on March 20, 2014. Version 10.0.2 adds the ability to export tracks in MP3 format as well as a new drummer module, but removed support for podcasting; users with podcast files created in GarageBand 6 can continue to edit them using the older version.

GarageBand was updated to version 10.0.3 on October 16, 2014. This version adds a dedicated Bass Amp Designer, global track effects and dynamic track resizing.

Apple released GarageBand 10.2 on June 5, 2017.

=== Features ===
==== Audio recording ====
GarageBand is a digital audio workstation (DAW) and music sequencer that can record and play back multiple tracks of audio. Built-in audio filters that use the AU (audio unit) standard allow the user to enhance the audio track with various effects, including reverb, echo, and distortion amongst others. GarageBand also offers the ability to record at both 16-bit and 24-bit Audio Resolution, but at a fixed sample rate of 44.1 kHz. An included tuning system helps with pitch correction and can effectively imitate the Auto-Tune effect when tuned to the maximum level. It also has a large array of preset effects to choose from, with an option to create one's own effects.

==== Virtual software instruments ====
GarageBand includes a large selection of realistic, sampled instruments and software-modeled synthesizers. These can be used to create original compositions or play music live through the use of a USB MIDI keyboard connected to the computer. An on-screen virtual keyboard is also available as well as using a standard QWERTY keyboard with the "musical typing" feature. The synthesizers were broken into two groups: [virtual] analog and digital. Each synthesizer has a wide variety of adjustable parameters, including richness, glide, cut off, standard attack, decay, sustain, and release; these allow for a wide array of sound creation. The five synth thumbnails are the ARP 2600, the Minimoog, the Waldorf Wave, the Nord Lead 1 and the Yamaha DX7.

==== Guitar features ====
In addition to the standard tracks, Garageband allows for guitar-specific tracks that can use a variety of simulated amplifiers, stomp boxes, and effects processors. These imitate popular hardware from companies including Marshall Amplification, Orange Music Electronic Company, and Fender Musical Instruments Corporation. Up to five simulated effects can be layered on top of the virtual amplifiers, which feature adjustable parameters including tone, reverb, and volume. Guitars can be connected to Macs using the built-in input (requires hardware that can produce a standard stereo signal using a 3.5mm output) or a USB interface.

==== MIDI editing ====
GarageBand can import MIDI files and offers piano roll or notation and playback. By complying with the MIDI Standard, a user can edit many different aspects of a recorded note, including pitch, velocity, and duration. Pitch was settable to 1/128 of a semitone, on a scale of 0–127 (sometimes described on a scale of 1–128 for clarity). Velocity, which determines amplitude (volume), can be set and adjusted on a scale of 0–127. Note duration can be adjusted manually via the piano roll or in the score view. Note rhythms can be played via the software instruments, or created in the piano roll environment; rhythm correction is also included to lock notes to any time signature subdivision. GarageBand also offers global editing capabilities to MIDI information with Enhanced Timing, also known as Quantizing. While offering comprehensive control over MIDI files, GarageBand does not include several features of professional-level DAWs, such as a sequencer for drum tracks separate from the normal piano roll. However, many of these shortcomings have been addressed with each successive release of GarageBand.

Also of note, MIDI sequences edited or created in GarageBand cannot be exported to other DAWs or programs (with the exception of Logic Pro) without first being converted to audio. A MIDI file can be extracted from a loop file created from a region, but this is not a general MIDI export facility, using manual steps and an open-source program.

==== Music lessons ====
A new feature included with GarageBand '09 and later is the ability to download pre-recorded music lessons from GarageBand's Lesson Store for guitar and piano. There are two types of lessons available in the Lesson Store: Basic Lessons, which are a free download, and Artist Lessons, which a user must purchase. The first Basic Lessons for both guitar and piano are included with GarageBand. In GarageBand 10, many sounds (aka patches, which Apple refers to as 'audio units') that are listed within the sound library are dimmed and unusable until the user pays an additional fee that allows the utilization of those sounds, bundled with the guitar and piano lessons. Attempting to click on and select the dimmed audio units to apply to the track causes promotional prompts to appear, requiring the user to log on with their Apple ID and furnish credit card information before knowing the price of the bundle.

In both types of lessons, a music teacher presents the lesson, which is in a special format offering high-quality video and audio instructions. The lessons include a virtual guitar or piano, which demonstrates finger position and a musical notation area to show the correct musical notations. The music examples used in these lessons feature popular music.

In an Artist Lesson the music teacher is the actual musician/songwriter who composed the song being taught in the lesson. As of November 2009 the artists featured are:

- Sting (The Police) — "Roxanne", "Message in a Bottle", "Fragile"
- Sarah McLachlan — "Angel"
- Patrick Stump of Fall Out Boy — "I Don't Care", "Sugar, We're Goin' Down"
- Norah Jones — "Thinking About You"
- Colbie Caillat — "Bubbly"
- Sara Bareilles — "Love Song"
- John Fogerty (Creedence Clearwater Revival) — "Proud Mary", "Fortunate Son", "Centerfield"
- Ryan Tedder (OneRepublic) — "Apologize"
- Ben Folds — "Brick", "Zak and Sara"
- John Legend — "Ordinary People"
- Alex Lifeson (Rush) — "Tom Sawyer", "Limelight", "Working Man", "The Spirit of Radio".

No new Artist Lessons were released in 2010, and Apple has not announced plans to release additional entries.

In June 2018, the GarageBand 10.3 update made Artist Lessons free.

=== Additional audio loops ===
Garageband includes an extensive selection of pre-made audio loops to choose from with an option to import custom sound loops and an additional loop pack that is purchasable via the App Store. All loops have an edit and effects option.

The Additional Audio Loops are as follows

==== Jam Packs ====
Jam Packs are Apple's official add-ons for GarageBand. Each Jam Pack contains loops and software instruments grouped into certain genres and styles.

The Jam Packs are as follows:

- GarageBand Jam Pack: Remix Tools
- GarageBand Jam Pack: Rhythm Section
- GarageBand Jam Pack: Symphony Orchestra
- GarageBand Jam Pack: World Music
- GarageBand Jam Pack: Voices

There was also another GarageBand Jam Pack, initially known just as GarageBand Jam Pack, later GarageBand Jam Pack 1, which Apple discontinued in January 2006. Beginning with the release of the Remix Tools and Rhythm Section Jam Packs, each Jam Pack has been designated with a number. The release of GarageBand Jam Pack: World Music also saw a redesign in packaging.

==== MainStage 2 ====
MainStage 2 by Apple also includes 40 built-in instruments – including synths, vintage keyboards, and a drum machine – to use in GarageBand. It also features an interface for live performances and includes a large collection of plug-ins and sounds.

=== Third-party instrument and Apple Loop packages ===
In addition to Apple, many other companies today offer commercial or shareware virtual software instruments designed especially for GarageBand, and collections of Apple Loops intended for GarageBand users.

GarageBand can also use any third-party software synthesizer that adheres to the Core Audio (Audio Units) standard. However, there are limitations, including that Audio Unit instruments which can respond to multiple MIDI channels or ports can be triggered only on the first channel of the first port. This means that multi-timbral instruments that contain multiple channels and respond to many MIDI channels, such as Native Instruments Kontakt and MOTU MachFive, are not ideally suited for use in GarageBand.

Third-party vendors also offer extra loops for use in GarageBand. Users can also record custom loops through a microphone, via a software instrument, or by using an audio interface to connect physically a guitar or other hardware instruments to a Mac or iOS device.

=== Sample multitrack source files ===
In 2005, Trent Reznor from the band Nine Inch Nails released the source multitrack GarageBand files for the song "The Hand That Feeds" to allow the public to experiment with his music, and permitted prospective GarageBand users to remix the song. He also gave permission for anyone to share their personalized remix with the world. Since then, Nine Inch Nails has released several more GarageBand source files, and several other artists have also released their GarageBand files that the public could use to experiment.

New Zealand band Evermore also released the source multi-track files for GarageBand for their song "Never Let You Go".

Ben Folds released Stems & Seeds, a special version of his 2008 album Way to Normal. Stems and Seeds contained a remastered version of Way to Normal, and a separate disc containing GarageBand files for each track from the album to allow fans to remix the songs.

=== Limitations ===
A lack of MIDI-out capability limits the use of external MIDI instruments. There is also only limited support for messages sent from knobs on MIDI keyboards, as only real-time pitch bend, modulation, sustain, and foot control are recognizable. However, since GarageBand '08, other parameters affected by MIDI knobs can be automated later, per-track. GarageBand has no functions for changing time signature mid-song though the software does now allow a tempo track to automate tempo changes.

Other than pitch bend, GarageBand is limited to the pitches and intervals of standard 12-tone equal temperament, so it does not natively support xenharmonic music. Logic Pro supports many different tunings. GarageBand does not support different tunings; however, audio units which support micro tuning (using .scl or .tun files, or some other method) can be employed in GarageBand to produce alternative pitches.

Before GarageBand 10, there was no export option, and the only option was to save files as .band or export to iTunes. There is no built-in MIDI export feature, although regions can be manually exported as loops and converted to MIDI files.

== GarageBand for iOS ==
GarageBand for iOS
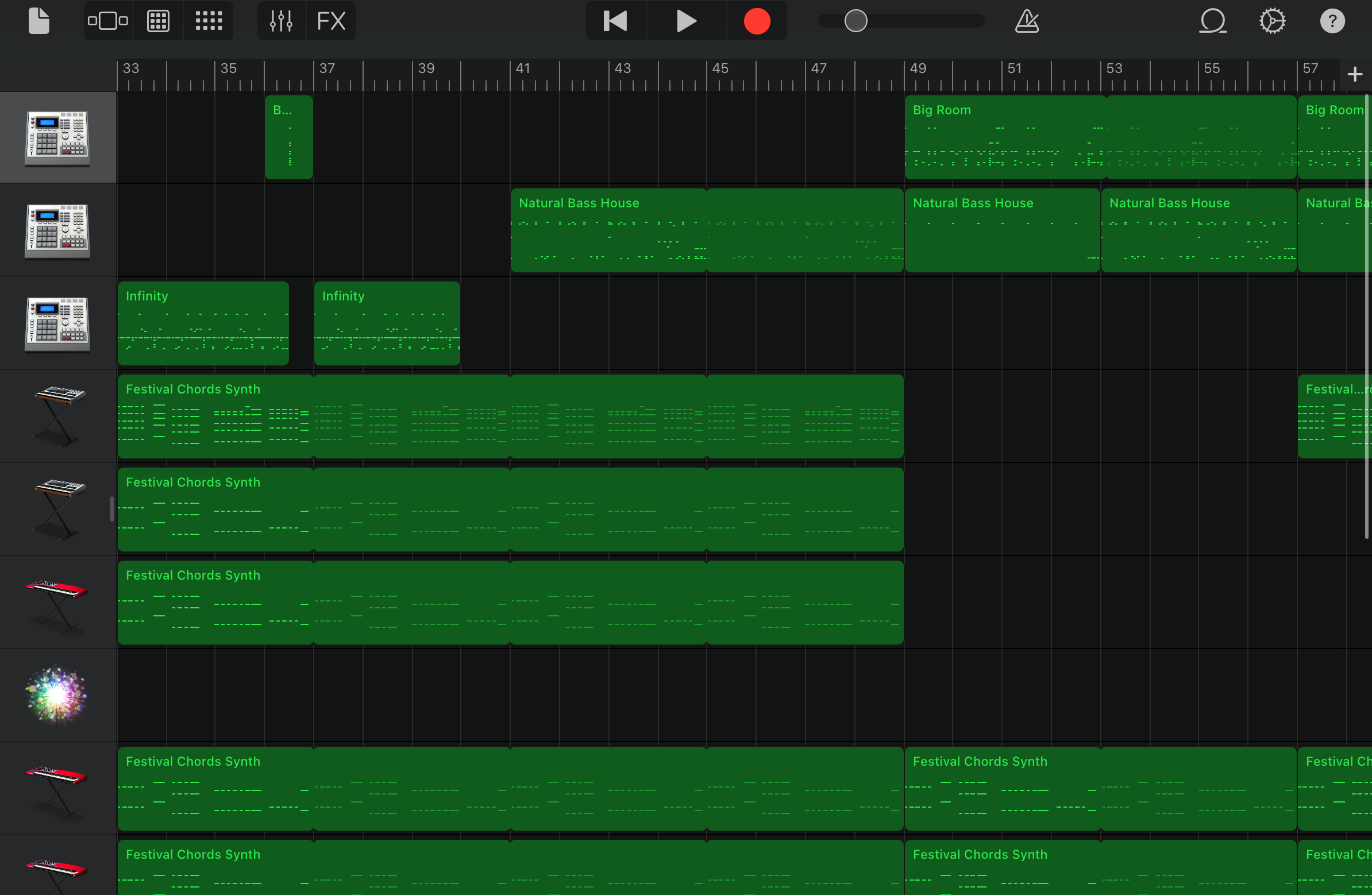
- GarageBand for iOS
- Developer: Apple
- Stable release: 2.3.15 / September 19, 2023; 3 years ago
- Operating system: iOS 26 or later, iPadOS 26
- Type: Digital audio workstation
- License: Proprietary
- Website: www.apple.com/ios/garageband/

On March 2, 2011, Apple announced a version of GarageBand for the iPad. It has many features similar to the macOS version. Music can be created using the on-screen instruments, which include keyboards, drums, a sampler, and various "smart instruments". It also acts as a multitrack recording studio with stomp box effects and guitar amps. Songs can be emailed or sent to an iTunes Library. Additionally, projects can be imported to GarageBand for macOS, where they are further editable. This feature also allows instruments from the iOS platform to be saveable to the software instrument library on the Mac. However, projects created in the macOS version cannot be opened in the iOS version, unless the "Project to Garageband for iOS" feature is used. The app is compatible with iPhone 3GS or higher, the third generation iPod Touch or higher, and all versions of the iPad, including the iPad Mini. The app, with all instruments included, was available for $6.99 from the Apple App Store. In 2017, it was made free.

=== Instruments ===
GarageBand iOS comes with a wide range of instruments. All non-drum instruments come with the functionality to limit the note selection to different musical scales.

==== Keyboard ====
The keyboard is set up like a standard musical keyboard, and features several keyboard instruments, including grand piano, electric piano, B-3 organ, and clavinet as well as synth leads, synth pads, and bass synths which use Logic Pro's Retro Synth engine. It also has many different non-keyboard instrument sounds including versions of many of the other instruments, for example users can use the keyboard to play guitar, bass and string sounds. In version 2.2, the Alchemy Synth synth engine from Logic Pro was also added to the keyboard. The keyboard has several additional features including a pitch bend, arpeggiator and "autoplay" function (which will play one of four rhythms for each instrument). Many of the instruments have adjustable parameters such as Attack, Cutoff and Resonance. Prior to version 2.2 there was also a separate "Smart Keyboard" instrument which was arranged like the other smart instruments, allowing the user to play chords on a limited selection of keyboard instruments (piano, electric piano, organ, clavinet, and four adjustable synthesizers). This functionality has since been integrated into the main keyboard instrument in version 2.2 with the new "Chord Strips" that allow the user to access the layout from the Smart Keyboard using any keyboard instrument. Wind instruments including flute, clarinet, oboe, bassoon, french horn, and full brass, along with glockenspiel were among the instruments added in version 2.3.

==== Sampler ====
In the sampler, the user can import or record their own sound and then play it on the keyboard (it has the same interface as the keyboard instrument). After the sound has been recorded or imported, it can be modified with a various amount of tools within the sampler in order to trim or reverse the sample, loop a section of it or adjust the tuning and volume envelope of the sample. The app comes with numerous sound effects such as a dog bark, party horn and cheering already available to use in the sampler.

==== Smart Guitar ====
GarageBand includes five guitars: an acoustic guitar, three electric guitars, and a distortion guitar. Each guitar (except for the acoustic one) has two optional sound boxes. The instrument is set up with two different modes. The first is set up like the Chord Strips, where multiple chords are playable. Each note in a chord can also be played separately, or muted by holding the left side of the string. This mode includes an autoplay feature which will play one of four different rhythms depending on which guitar is chosen.

==== Smart Bass ====
The bass instrument is set up like the guitar, where four strings can play various notes. However, the bass cannot play chords. Included are three electric basses, an acoustic upright bass, and four customizable Retro Synth bass synths. Like the smart keyboard and smart guitars, there is an "autoplay" feature.

==== Smart Strings ====
Smart Strings were added in version 1.2 and consist of a string section made of 1st and 2nd violins, violas, cellos, and bass. They are capable of playing notes legato, staccato, and pizzicato depending on if the user swipes up and down, flicks or taps their screen respectively. The orchestra is customizable, including four different string styles (all with a different "autoplay" feature) and the option to choose which instruments to play. For example, one can play a chord made up of all the available instruments, or simply play a violin note.

==== World ====
The World instruments were added in version 2.3 which allow the user to play traditional Chinese and Japanese instruments. The instruments available are the pipa, erhu, koto and guzheng.

==== Drums ====
There are three different kinds of drum instruments in GarageBand. The touch drums instrument includes by default seven acoustic drum kits with a realistic drum kit layout, and twelve electronic drum kits (including Hip-Hop drums, House drums, and drum kits with Roland TR-808 and 909 samples). The electronic kits are set up like drum machines with customizable sounds that can be saved as separate drum kits. In version 2.3, the Chinese Kit, which includes a variety of Chinese percussion instruments, were added along with Taiko drums. The "Smart Drums" instrument allows the arranging of drum sounds on a grid by complexity and volume. It contains a selection of six drums (Classic Studio Kit, Live Rock Kit, Vintage Kit, Classic Drum Machine, Hip Hop Drum Machine, and House Drum Machine). The "Beat Sequencer" involves the placement of steps to form a beat pattern. There are many pre-set patterns to choose from and users can customise aspects of the pattern such as note velocity and probability.

==== Drummer ====
The Drummer was added in version 2.1 and is a virtual player who will create realistic drum grooves. There are numerous drummers to choose from in various genres. Each drummer has a unique kit, which can be an acoustic, electronic or percussion drum kit. Users can also customise the playing style of each drummer, including choosing from various preset rhythms. They can also adjust which parts of the drum kit the drummer will play, the amount of swing and if the drummer should follow the rhythm of another track.

==== Audio recorder ====
The audio recorded is a standard recorder for recording and editing audio. Audio can be recorded through the device's internal microphone, a headphone microphone or external microphone connected to the device via an audio interface. After the sound has been recorded, many audio effects can be applied. The recorder comes with various presets designed for recording different sounds like guitar, piano or lead vocals, all with adjustable parameters.

==== Amp ====
The amp is designed to be played by plugging a guitar or bass into the device and recording, but can also work with sounds from the audio recorder, included Apple Loops, and imported music files. Within it are several customizable amplifiers and stomp boxes, allowing for a broad range of different sounds.

==== External apps ====
Third-party music apps can be used inside GarageBand in one of two ways. The Audio Unit Extensions feature allows third-party instruments and effect plug-ins to be played and used directly inside GarageBand as if they were native to the app. The Inter-App Audio functionality lets users record audio from another app into GarageBand.

==== Sound Library ====
The Sound Library was added in November 2017 with the 2.3.1 update and lets the user download additional free content as Sound Packs that are added to the app over time. Each Sound Pack includes one or more of a variety of additional instruments, drummers, loops, or amplifier effects, and are each centered around specific styles of music.

As of 2026, the following sound packs can be downloaded on GarageBand for iOS:

- 8-Bit Legends (Chiptune)
- Alpha Waves (Ambient)
- Backlight Bounce (Slap House)
- Bass Amp Boutique (Bass amps)
- Beat Sequencer Kits (Sequenced drums)
- Beat Tape (Hip-hop)
- Brush Drummers (Jazz drums)
- Chinese Traditional (Guzheng)
- Chromium Fray (Bass House)
- Dancefloor Rush (Drum and Bass)
- Drill Yard (Drill)
- Eko Soul (Afrobeats)
- Edges and Angles (Future Bass)
- Electronic Drummers (Electronic drums)
- Flex and Flow (Lofi Hip-hop)
- Gozadera Latina (Reggaeton)
- Japanese Traditional (Koto, Taiko drums)
- Keyboard Collections (Keyboard instruments)
- Magnetic Imperfections (Tape music)
- Modular Rhythms (Synth drums)
- Oblique Structures (Minimal techno)
- Percussionists (Latin percussion)
- Prismatica (Nu-Disco)
- R&B Drummers (R&B drums)
- Rock Drummers (Rock drums)
- Songwriter Drummers (Songwriter drums)
- Skyline Heat (Trap, Hip-hop)
- Step Reflex (UK Garage)
- Tone Collection (Guitar amps)
- Toy Box (Sound effects)
- Transition Effects (Beat drops)
- Ultimate 808s (TR-808, Hip-hop)
- Vintage Drum Machines (Drum machines)
- Vision and Verse (Classic Hip-hop)
- Vox Melodics (Vocal samples)

In addition to these Sound Packs, Producer Packs were released in collaboration with prominent music artists and producers. Self-titled Producer Packs were created by Tosin Abasi, Boys Noize, Oak Felder, Hardwell, The Kount, Mark Lettieri, PomPom, Soulection, Take a Daytrip, TRAKGIRL, Cory Wong, and Sergio George. Additionally, Mark Ronson created a Producer Pack as a companion to his Apple TV docuseries Watch the Sound with Mark Ronson.

=== Updates ===
On November 1, 2011, Apple introduced GarageBand for iOS 1.1, adding support for the iPhone and iPod Touch, among other features. These included the ability to use the 3/4 and 6/8 time signatures, and exporting in AAC or AIFF format.

On March 7, 2012, Apple updated GarageBand to 1.2, adding support for the third-generation iPad. It introduced the new Smart Strings instrument, a string orchestra of 1st and 2nd violins, violas, celli, and bass, capable of playing notes legato, staccato, and pizzicato. Additionally, it added synthesizers to the Smart Keyboard and Smart Bass instruments. It also added a note editor that allows users to fine-tune note placement and length and the ability to upload songs to Facebook, YouTube and SoundCloud, as well as the ability to upload projects to iCloud. It also included Jam Session, a feature that enables up to four iPhones, iPod Touches, and/or iPads with GarageBand installed to play simultaneously.

On May 1, 2012, GarageBand was updated to 1.2.1, providing minor bug fixes and stability improvements.

Alongside the new iOS 6, Apple updated GarageBand to 1.3 on September 19, 2012. The update added the ability to import music from one's music library, ringtone creation, the ability to use the app in the background, and minor bug fixes.

GarageBand was updated to 1.4 on March 20, 2013. The update added support for Audiobus, the ability to remove grid snapping, and minor bug fixes.

GarageBand received an overhaul of design coinciding with the reveal of the iPad Air on October 22, 2013. GarageBand 2.0 features a new design to match iOS 7, an extended number of tracks per song, and new functions in the Sampler instrument.

In January 2016, version 2.1 was released in which GarageBand received a new Live Loops layout that lets users create and perform music by triggering loops and adding effects in real-time. Other features in the update included the ability to add a virtual Drummer, increased maximum number of tracks up to 32, the ability to edit volume automation curves and the addition of basic EQ and compressor plug-ins. Amplifiers for bass guitars were also added. Third-party instrument apps could now be used inside GarageBand via Audio Unit Extensions.

In January 2017, version 2.2 was released with a number of new features including the Alchemy Synth previously only available in Logic Pro. Audio Unit Extension compatibility was updated to also allow third-party effects apps to be used.

A new Sound Library was added in November 2017 which allows users to download additional free instruments and loops released as part of Sound Packs that are added to the app over time. A new Beat Sequencer for creating drum beats was also added in this update.

MIDI support was added in update 2.3.6 in September 2018.

In July 2021, GarageBand released multiple new Sound Packs with loops and instruments from many producers such as Boys Noize, as well as two Remix Sessions from Dua Lipa and Lady Gaga that allow users to remix their songs.

In August 2022, GarageBand released two Remix Sessions from Seventeen and Katy Perry.

In December 2022, GarageBand released a Remix Session from Zedd.

=== Differences from MacOS version ===
- No Music Lessons.
- Only three time signatures (4/4, 3/4, and 6/8).
- No master track.
- Automation is only available for volume.
- Live Loops layout.
- Audio Unit Extensions (via App Store).
- A Sound Library providing free, downloadable content such as additional keyboards, drum sets, and more.
- Limited exporting functions (As of 2.3.3, the option to export recorded projects as songs to YouTube has been removed).

== Notable users ==
GarageBand has been embraced by many musicians of varying levels of fame in order to record and produce music. Steve Lacy used the GarageBand app on his cracked 2012 iPhone to produce music for his solo projects, like his song "Dark Red", the Internet, and J. Cole. That phone is currently on display in the Smithsonian. Nine Inch Nails made their song "The Hand That Feeds" in the software, and released a link to the multitrack GarageBand file on the band's website, allowing other GarageBand users to remix the song. Musicians that have collaborated with Apple to promote GarageBand include Katy Perry, John Mayer, Dua Lipa, Billie Eilish, and Lady Gaga. Charlotte Day Wilson, Doja Cat, Ellie Rowsell (of Wolf Alice), Sloan Struble (of Dayglow), Meghan Trainor, Ethel Cain, and Awkwafina all began learning to produce and create music using GarageBand. GarageBand was also used by artists such as T-Pain; Grimes for her album Visions; St. Vincent for multiple projects; Danielle Haim for Haim songs, with the song "Summer Girl" starting out as a GarageBand demo; and Jesse Rutherford for his sophomore solo album, GARAGEB&, named after the application, as he produced most of the tracks in GarageBand. In addition, Rihanna's hit "Umbrella" was born from a stock GarageBand drum track. Fiona Apple largely recorded her album Fetch the Bolt Cutters at home with GarageBand. As well, the music for the viral internet video Charlie the Unicorn was recorded in GarageBand.

== Availability and compatibility ==
Prior to the launch of Apple's Mac App Store, GarageBand was only available as a part of iLife, a suite of applications (also including iPhoto, iMovie, iDVD, and iWeb) intended to simplify the creation and organization of digital content, or available on a new Mac. On January 6, 2011, GarageBand was made available independently on the Mac App Store in addition to iPhoto and iMovie. Since then GarageBand's user base has increased significantly.

As both the Mac and iOS versions of GarageBand are compatible with Logic Pro, a project created or edited in GarageBand can be directly opened into Logic Pro with no additional steps required. A Logic Pro project can also be exported to GarageBand iOS as a flattened master track, where new tracks added in GarageBand are also added to the original Logic Pro project once opened.

This app supports many music formats, including AIFF, WAV, and MIDI. The app can export songs to AAC, MP3, MP4 or AIFF format. Support for 8-bit audio files was dropped in version 10.

== See also ==
- List of MIDI editors and sequencers
- List of music software
