= IWeb =

HTML editor

iWeb

- A screenshot of iWeb 3.0.1, part of iLife '09
- Developer: Apple Inc.
- Release: January 10, 2006; 20 years ago
- Final release: 3.0.4 / July 11, 2011
- Operating system: Mac OS X
- Type: HTML editor
- License: Proprietary
- Website: www.apple.com/ilife/iweb/

iWeb is a template-based WYSIWYG website creation tool developed by Apple Inc. The first version of iWeb was announced at the Macworld Conference & Expo on January 10, 2006, as part of the iLife '06 suite of digital lifestyle applications. iWeb '11 was released on October 20, 2010 as part of the iLife '11 suite, though it was not updated from the previous release (version 3.0.2).

iWeb allows users to create websites and blogs and customize them with their own text, photos, and movies. Users could then publish their websites to MobileMe or another hosting service via FTP. In addition to its ability to publish to MobileMe, Apple supported iWeb integration with other services, including Facebook, YouTube, AdSense and Google Maps. Apple ceased development of iWeb in 2011.

== Overview and features ==
=== Page design ===
iWeb allows users to create and design websites and blogs without coding and includes a number of Apple-designed themes, each of which have several page templates with coordinated fonts and colors. Pages can be customized by replacing placeholder text and by dragging and dropping users' own photos and movies into the document. Templates include blog, podcast, and photo and movie gallery pages as well as standard "Welcome" and "About Me" pages.

iWeb integrates with other applications in the iLife suite. The iLife Media Browser is a list of all the music, movies, and photos stored in iTunes, iMovie, and iPhoto. Content dragged from the Media Browser window can be placed in the open page. Local files can also be dropped directly into the page.

Nine interactive "widgets" are included with iWeb. Among other functions, these widgets let users embed YouTube videos and Google Maps, include a countdown timer and add RSS feeds.

=== Publishing ===
iWeb featured built-in support for publishing to MobileMe, a suite of online applications developed by Apple, and to other third-party web hosts with FTP. Once account information was entered, users simply clicked a button to publish their entire website. iWeb could then publish updates to the user's Facebook profile to notify others of changes to the website.

=== Limitations ===
iWeb was in its third version at the time of discontinuation, and had a limited feature set and some unresolved bugs. Some limitations included:

- Separate CSS files are created for each page, rather than a single stylesheet for the entire site.
- No option to directly edit the HTML code of templates. HTML editing is limited to small snippets embedded into the page.
- Password protection is not implemented on websites not hosted on MobileMe.
- Blog page comments are not implemented on websites not hosted on MobileMe.
- Creating templates requires third-party software and has been criticized as being overly complex.

=== Discontinuation of iWeb in iCloud transition ===
In June 2011, rumors emerged that iWeb would not be developed further. On June 30, 2012, Apple discontinued MobileMe. All iWeb websites hosted on MobileMe disappeared if not hosted elsewhere. Apple provided instructions of how to move iWeb sites to another host.
