= ROX Desktop =

Desktop environment for X Window System

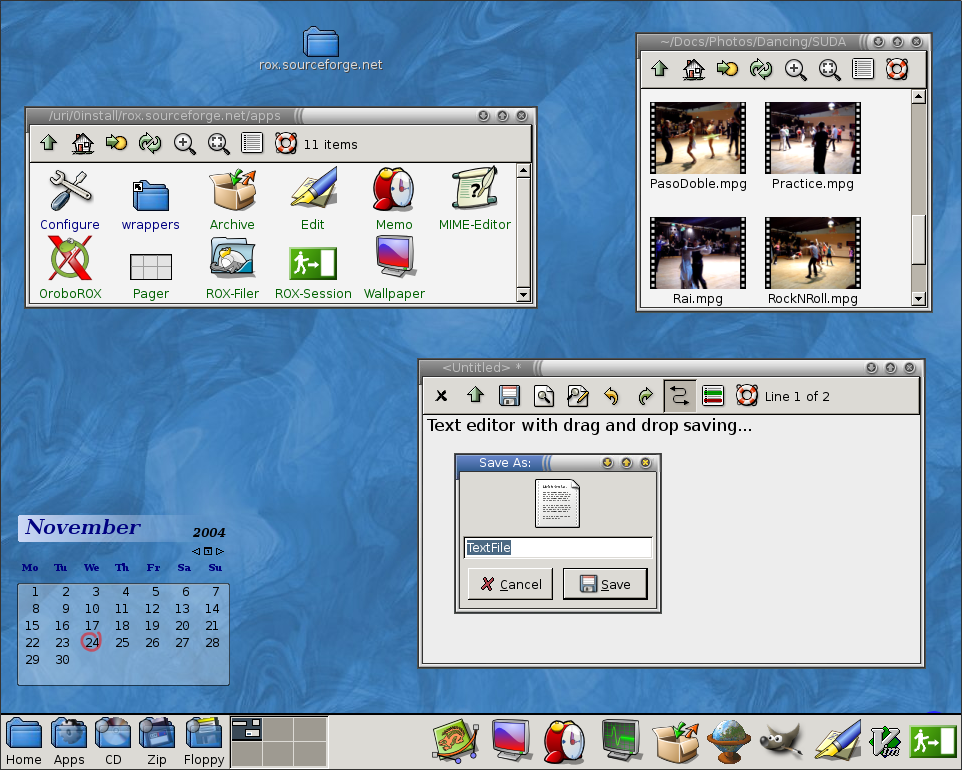
- A screenshot of the ROX desktop
- Initial release: 1999; 27 years ago
- Final release: 2.11 / October 9, 2011; 14 years ago
- Written in: C, Python, GTK
- Operating system: Unix-like
- Type: Desktop environment
- License: GNU General Public License
- Website: rox.sourceforge.net/desktop/
- Repository: github.com/rox-desktop/

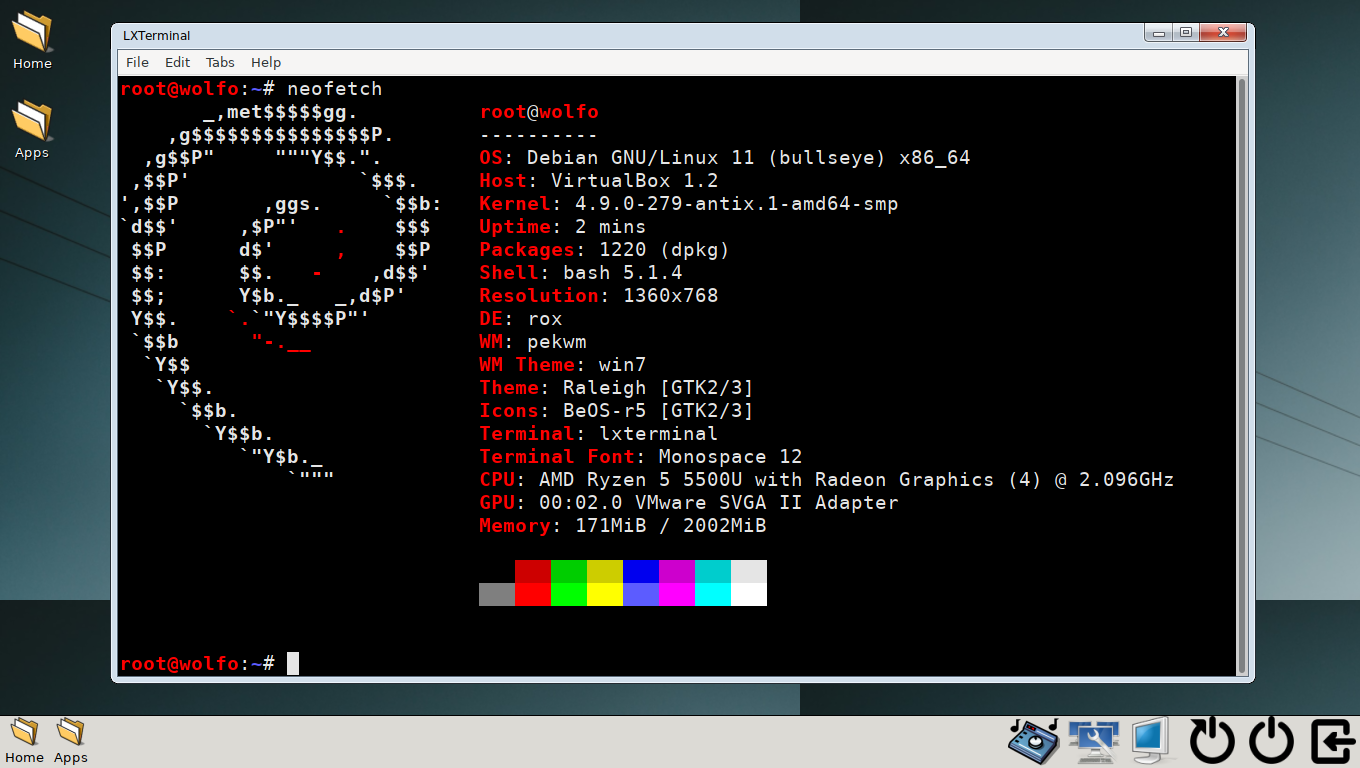
Lxterminal (one of many Linux terminal or console applications) running neofetch, showing AntiX Linux 21 running ROX Desktop 2.11.

The ROX Desktop is a discontinued graphical desktop environment for the X Window System. It is based on the ROX-Filer, a drag and drop spatial file manager. It is free software released under the GPL-2.0-or-later. The environment was inspired by the user interface of RISC OS (not to be confused with RISC/os). The name "ROX" is derived from "RISC OS on X Window System". Programs can be installed or removed easily using Zero Install, a decentralized software installation system.

The project was started by Thomas Leonard as a student at the University of Southampton in 1999 and was still led by him in 2012.

== Software components ==
The ROX Desktop is a desktop environment based on the ROX-Filer file manager. Files are loaded by applications using drag and drop from the filer to the application, and saved by dragging back to the filer. Applications are executable directories, and thus can be installed (copied), uninstalled (deleted), and run directly through the filer interface. ROX has a strong link with Zero Install, a system for identifying and executing programs via a URL, which aims to make software installation automatic.

The desktop uses the GTK toolkit, similar to the GNOME and Xfce desktops. The design focuses on small, simple programs that use drag-and-drop to move data between them. For example, a user might load data from a compressed file from the web into a spreadsheet by dragging the file from the web browser to the archiver, and then from the archiver into the spreadsheet. A program could be installed similarly, by dragging the archive from the web to the archiver, and then from the archiver to the applications directory in the filer.

Drag-and-drop saving allows a user to save a file to any directory, or directly to another application, such as an archiver on the panel.

== ROX Filer ==
ROX-Filer
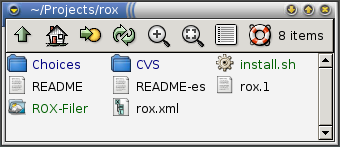
- Screenshot of ROX-Filer
- Original author: Thomas Leonard
- Operating system: Unix-like
- Type: File manager
- License: GPL-2.0-or-later
- Website: rox.sourceforge.net/desktop/ROX-Filer.html
- Repository: github.com/rox-desktop

ROX-Filer is a graphical spatial file manager for the X Window System. It can be used standalone or as part of the ROX Desktop. It is the default file manager in certain Linux distributions such as Puppy Linux and Dyne:bolic, and was used in Xubuntu until Thunar became stable.

ROX-Filer is built using the GTK+ toolkit. Available under the terms of the GPL-2.0-or-later, ROX-Filer is free software.

== Zero Install ==
Zero Install
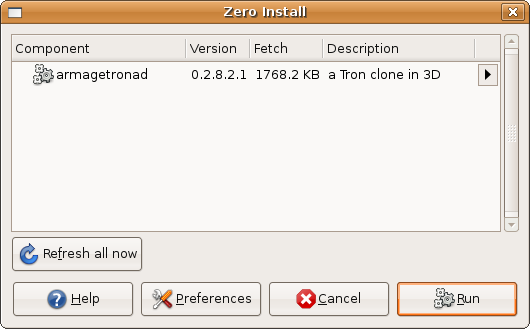
- Zero Install ready to run a downloaded program
- Developer: Thomas Leonard
- Stable release: 2.17 / May 4, 2020; 6 years ago
- Written in: OCaml
- Operating system: Linux, Unix, macOS, Windows
- Type: Package manager
- License: LGPLv2.1
- Website: 0install.net
- Repository: github.com/0install/0install

Zero Install (or 0install) is a multi-platform (Windows, Linux, macOS) system for running applications, enabling decentralized publishing (without using a traditional central repositories, directly from project websites). Unlike simple xcopy deployment, Zero Install retains the advantages of repositories, such as shared libraries, automatic updates, and validation of digital signatures.

Zero Install uses metadata (sometimes called the feed format) written in XML. Similar to xcopy deployment, each application gets its own directory, and there are no side effects on the OS. This eliminates the need for administrative rights, and different versions of the same application can be run side-by-side without special modifications.

To run an application, the user uses a launcher in ROX-Filer. This launcher instructs the system to run the application specified by a URL within the launcher's script. The first time it is launched, the system uses the URL to download the program and save it. On subsequent launches, the system does not download it again. This mechanism is referred to as 'Zero Install' because the launcher aims to run the program directly rather than performing a traditional installation process.

== See also ==
- Comparison of X Window System desktop environments
- Package manager

== Sources ==
- Eicher, Bastian (2011). Desktop Integration Management for Portable, Zero-Install and Virtualized Applications (PDF). Department of Computer Science (BS thesis). Karlsruhe Institute of Technology.

== Notes ==
- Bruce Byfield (7 February 2007) ROX Desktop provides light, quirky alternative to GNOME and KDE, Linux.com
- (in German) Jo Moskalewski (July 2002) ' RISC rocks. Jo´s alternativer Desktop: ROX LinuxUser
