= IDVD =

DVD authoring application by Apple

iDVD

- Screenshot of iDVD '08
- Developer: Apple Inc.
- Release: January 9, 2001; 25 years ago
- Final release: '11 (v7.1.2) / July 11, 2011; 15 years ago
- Operating system: Mac OS 9, Mac OS X
- Type: DVD authoring
- License: Proprietary
- Website: Homepage at the Wayback Machine (archived January 18, 2012)

iDVD is a discontinued Mac application made by Apple, which can be used to create DVDs.

iDVD lets users design DVD menus (like a main menu and chapter selection menu) and burn movies, slideshows, and music onto a DVD that can be played on a commercial DVD player. It was created as part of Apple's "digital hub" strategy, as a companion tool to iMovie. Early versions were received positively, but later versions languished as internet video overtook DVDs, and iDVD was abandoned in 2011.

== Features ==
iDVD includes over 150 Apple-designed themes. Themes set the layout, background art, typography, and soundtrack for DVD menus and submenus, and each theme includes a main DVD menu, a chapter navigation menu, and an Extras screen. Users can customize the fonts, add freeform text boxes, and change the position and style of buttons. (In iDVD, the term button refers to thumbnails like "Play" and "Scene Selection" in DVD menus, that can take viewers to different parts of the movie; these buttons can be selected with the TV remote when playing a burned disc.)

Most themes include "drop zones," decorative placeholders for movies, slideshows, or individual photos. On the burned disc, these "drop zone" movies and slideshows play on a loop while viewers are in a menu. Depending on the selected theme, each menu screen can have between 6 and 12 buttons. If users add more movies than can fit on one screen, iDVD adds submenus to fit those new movies. Users can also manually create submenus. Each menu can have its own theme.

iDVD integrated tightly with the rest of the iLife suite. iMovie projects and iPhoto slideshows can be exported from those applications to iDVD. In the case of iMovie projects, scene selection menus are automatically created in accordance with chapter markers that were set within iMovie. iDVD's Media panel can be used to import media from the user's iTunes library, iPhoto library, and Movies folder. iDVD also has a Map view, which shows a flow chart of the project's menu hierarchy. The Map view includes an Autoplay tile, and any video dragged onto that tile will automatically play when the DVD is inserted into a player, before the menu appears; the DVD may consist of nothing but Autoplay material, and hence contain no menus. A menu bar button lets users enable gridlines showing the TV-safe area (as old televisions often cut off some of a video's outer areas). iDVD also incorporates a "OneStep DVD" function, which automatically rewinds the connected miniDV-tape camcorder, imports its footage, and directly burns it to a DVD.

== History ==
=== Background ===
iDVD was part of Apple's push into digital video in the late 1990s and early 2000s. Apple had already released iMovie, and Steve Jobs thought users would want to burn their iMovie projects onto a DVD to show their movies to friends and family. Apple executives decided to add DVD-R drives to Macintoshes and make a simple tool to burn these movies. In April 2000, Apple bought Astarte's DVD department and used their software as the basis for DVD Studio Pro, while also creating a simpler version for consumers, iDVD. One of the acquired Astarte employees was Mike Evangelist, responsible for iDVD's product marketing and design. Jobs rejected Evangelist's early design proposal in favor of a simpler single-window interface.

=== Announcement ===
iDVD 2 had the same minimalistic brushed metal interface as iDVD 1.

Steve Jobs introduced iDVD at Macworld Expo SF in January 2001, as a companion tool to iMovie. The intended workflow was for users to be able to record footage with a digital camcorder, import it and edit it in iMovie, and then use iDVD to add DVD menus and burn their movie to a writable DVD. iDVD was bundled with Power Mac G4 models with a SuperDrive, and Apple also began selling writable DVDs for $10 each. Simultaneously with iDVD, Apple announced DVD Studio Pro, a DVD authoring tool for professional users sold separately from Final Cut Pro.

iDVD 1 had a brushed-metal, single-window interface, and includes pre-made themes, as well as the ability to create custom themes. It encoded movies to the MPEG2 format required by DVD players, using the PowerPC G4's AltiVec SIMD execution unit (called the "Velocity Engine" by Apple). According to Apple, encoding an hour-long DVD with the Velocity Engine would take 2 hours, as opposed to 25 hours with software encoders. During the keynote where he introduced iDVD, Jobs criticized competitors' predictions that the personal computer was "yesterday's platform" and would be supplanted by internet-connected mobile devices. Instead, Jobs said the PC would become the "digital hub" linking these peripherals, including camcorders and DVD players. iDVD 1 could not burn movies longer than an hour.

=== Updates ===
iDVD 2 increased the maximum movie length to 90 minutes. iDVD 3 gained support for movie chapters, and "drop zones" where users can replace a theme's default photos and video clips by dragging and dropping their own. iDVD 4 extended the maximum movie length from 90 minutes to 2 hours, by adopting the same MPEG encoding techniques as Apple's DVD Studio Pro and Final Cut Pro. It also added the Autoplay tile and the Map view showing a hierarchy of all menus. iDVD 5 added support for DVD±RW, and gained the "OneStep DVD" feature, which could automatically rewind the tape of a connected camcorder, import its footage, and burn it to a DVD. iDVD 5.0.1 added support for burning double-layer (DVD+R DL) discs with compatible SuperDrives; French Mac news site MacBidouille found a way to enable double-layer mode with third-party drives, and described the restriction as arbitrary. iDVD 6 added widescreen support, and a "Magic iDVD" feature that automatically chose a theme and arranged clips and photos. iDVD '08 gained new themes and a "Professional Quality" setting, which does a 2-pass variable bitrate encoding. The Professional Quality setting improves colors and sharpness, and can fit a two-hour long movie onto a single-layer DVD.

iDVD received no new features or themes after version '08.

== Reception ==
After the announcement, Andrew Gore described iDVD as "the most easily misunderstood new product" Apple announced in January but predicted that iDVD "will be to DVD-R what iTunes is to CD-RW". In the following years, several news outlets described the reaction to iDVD as positive. Macworld and EMedia magazine said that iDVD would help popularize DVD authoring among the masses.

In a three-part review of the first version, Jason Snell said it was easy to use but buggy. CNET rated iDVD 2 a 7/10, criticizing the need to switch to iMovie to edit footage and the inability to burn DVDs with third-party DVD drives. CNET reported several bugs with iDVD 4, and iDVD 5. Reviewing iDVD 5, PCMag gave it 4.5 stars, and said its burning speed was superior to most competing apps. In a 2006 review of iDVD 6, reporter Jeff Carlson described iDVD's preview as choppy, even on a fast Mac, but said that this didn't affect playback of the burned disc on a DVD player. Ars Technica criticized iDVD 6's performance and menu customization features.

In 2007, Macworld's Jeff Carlson called iDVD an "afterthought" and framed its future as an open question, after Steve Jobs unenthusiastically referred to "people who still want to make DVDs" in a media event. Apple executives and Gartner researcher Mike McGuire said that the neglect of iDVD and DVD Studio Pro was caused by reduced customer interest following the rise of internet video. In 2009, Ars Technica described iDVD as a "quaint anachronism as more and more video is shared and streamed online". Several outlets noted that iDVD was not mentioned during the iLife '09 keynote presentation, and was not mentioned on the iLife '09 retail box despite being included in the bundle.

== Limitations ==
Until version 3.0.1, iDVD could only run on Macs with a built-in SuperDrive. In July 2002, Apple-certified vendor Other World Computing, which sold third-party external DVD drives, released a "DVD Enabler" patch that allowed iDVD to work with their Mercury Pro drive and presented iDVD compatibility as a selling point. In response, Apple threatened a DMCA lawsuit, and OWC backed down, withdrawing DVD Enabler. Journalists criticized the SuperDrive restriction, with Ars Technica's editor-in-chief calling it a "scheme to promote hardware sales".

iDVD 3.0.1 gained the ability to run on Macs without a SuperDrive, though on these machines, it could only create and save projects, not burn them to a disc. iDVD 5 remained unable to burn DVDs with third-party drives, though it gained the ability to save finished projects as a disk image, which could be burned with third-party drives using other applications like Roxio Toast. iDVD 6 added the ability to burn DVDs with third-party drives.

== Availability ==
iDVD 1 only worked on Mac OS 9, while later versions only ran on Mac OS X.

Until 2011, iDVD was bundled with all new Macs that had a SuperDrive. iDVD was no longer preinstalled on Macs shipping with OS X 10.7 Lion, and was not available on the Mac App Store unlike other iLife apps. It was, however, still available in the boxed copy of iLife '11. Since iDVD is a 32-bit application, it is not compatible with macOS 10.15 Catalina. Alternatives include Toast Titanium, and a free and open-source application called Burn.

== Version history ==
Version	iLife	Release date	Ref
1	—N/a	January 9, 2001	
2	—N/a	October 31, 2001	
3	iLife	January 31, 2003	
4	iLife '04	January 16, 2004	
5	iLife '05	January 22, 2005	
6	iLife '06	January 10, 2006	
'08 (v7)	iLife '08	August 7, 2007	
'09 (v7.0.3)	iLife '09	January 27, 2009	
'11 (v7.1)	iLife '11	October 20, 2010	

== See also ==
- List of DVD authoring applications
