= Aperture (software) =

Image organizer for macOS

- Aperture 3 running on OS X Mavericks
- Developer: Apple Inc.
- Release: November 30, 2005; 20 years ago
- Final release: 3.6 / October 16, 2014; 12 years ago
- Written in: Objective-C
- Operating system: macOS
- Successor: Photomator
- Type: Image organizer, image editor
- License: Proprietary
- Website: Homepage at the Wayback Machine (archived April 7, 2015)

Aperture is a discontinued professional image organizer and editor developed by Apple between 2005 and 2015 for the Mac, as a professional alternative to iPhoto.

Aperture is a non-destructive editor that can handle a number of tasks common in post-production work, such as importing and organizing image files, applying adjustments, and printing or exporting photographs. It can organize photos by keywords, facial recognition, and location data embedded in image files, it offers brushes for applying effects such as dodge and burn, skin smoothing, and polarization, and it can export to Flickr, Facebook, SmugMug, and iCloud.

At WWDC 2014, Apple announced that its Photos app would replace Aperture and iPhoto. The final release of Aperture, version 3.6, was released in October 2014, and subsequently discontinued and removed from sale on April 8, 2015. Although support for 32-bit apps, including Aperture, was removed in macOS Catalina, a patch created by an external party allows Aperture 3.6 to function on newer versions of macOS.

== Features ==
Apple Aperture is a professional photo editing and management application that offers a variety of features for professional photographers. One of its key features is complete support for importing and exporting raw image formats, for supported cameras. It also offers tethered shooting support for DSLRs made by Nikon and Canon; when photographers connect these cameras to their computers, they can be instantly imported without user action, for a more efficient workflow. The app's Raw Fine Tuning feature allows users to manage and adjust the conversion parameters of different versions of RAW decode. In addition, Aperture allows users to choose whether to keep their master image files in place on their filesystem, or migrate them into the Aperture library upon import.

Aperture also offers a range of image adjustment tools, including specific color retouching, a luminance-based edge sharpener, and spot repair. It also has lens correction tools, such as chromatic aberration correction, to help improve the overall quality of an image. In terms of project management, Aperture offers extensive metadata and searching support, as well as the ability to group photos using autostacking based on the time between shutter clicks.

Aperture offers a number of features for organizing and managing photos. Autostacking groups photos based on the time between shutter clicks; users can also manually group photos into Stacks, and create multiple working copies of the same image using the Versions feature. The loupe tool allows users to view images at zoom levels from 50% to 1600%, while the Light Table feature serves as a freeform workspace for sorting and selecting images. Aperture also offers the ability to simultaneously zoom and pan multiple images to compare them. It supports a full-screen mode for editing and sorting images, and can span multiple computer displays.

In addition to its native support for the Adobe Photoshop PSD, PNG, JPEG, and TIFF formats, Aperture offers nondestructive image editing, customizable printing and publishing options, and the ability to import photos from USB and FireWire memory card readers or directly from a camera connected via USB. It also has read and write support for IPTC image metadata and customizable book creation tools. Finally, Aperture has a heavily customizable book creation feature, as well as the ability to create web galleries and blogs that can be uploaded via FTP or WebDAV.

Unlike Adobe Lightroom, Aperture stores photos by default inside a package, rather than inside normal folders, however it can also manage photos stored in regular folders (referenced files)

== History ==
=== Aperture 2 ===
On February 12, 2008, Aperture 2 was released with a new interface, new editing features, and a reduced price of $199 in the United States. This was a significant decrease from the initial price of $499 for version 1.0. Aperture 2 included a streamlined interface and improved performance due to database optimizations and interface improvements. It also featured enhanced image processing capabilities with updated raw image format support and improved integration with macOS, MobileMe (now iCloud), and various software packages including iLife and iWork. In addition, Aperture 2 introduced support for editing plug-ins, such as Apple's own dodging and burning tool, which was added in Aperture 2.1.

=== Aperture 3 ===
Aperture 3 was released on February 9, 2010, and required an Intel-based Mac, unlike previous versions which could run on PowerPC systems. Upon the launch of the Mac App Store on January 6, 2011, Aperture 3.0 was made available through the store at a reduced price of $80 in the United States. Apple claimed that the new version included over 200 new features. Aperture became a 64-bit application capable of handling large files such as high definition scans, a face detection and recognition tool called Faces, a Places feature that automatically places photos on a world map, native integration with Flickr and Facebook, nondestructive, edge-aware brushes for applying adjustments to photos, dozens of new built-in adjustment presets, the ability to create custom presets for download, advanced slideshow capabilities, and the ability to handle and edit video and audio files.

== Discontinuation ==
The summer 2014 beta of OS X 10.10 Yosemite was incompatible with Aperture, leading to speculation that Apple may abandon the application. (Note: Later that year, Aperture received a Yosemite compatibility update.)

On June 27, 2014, Apple announced that Aperture and iPhoto would be discontinued in favor of the upcoming Photos app. Several users said Aperture had suffered from neglect and fallen behind competitors like Adobe Lightroom, and that the discontinuation followed years of Apple neglecting professional users. Apple announced a migration path to Photos, but not to Lightroom or other tools. Adobe promised an Aperture import plugin for Lightroom, which they released in October 2014. This import plugin cannot import non-destructive image adjustments made in Aperture, so it imports both the original images, and a copy of each edited image. Another import tool is CYME's Avalanche application.

According to Apple, the upcoming Photos app would have "professional-grade features" like "library search, support for third-party plugins, and advanced editing", though by its 2015 release, the Photos app lacked support for many Aperture features including tethered shooting, watermarks, separate projects within one library, plug-ins, editing in an external application, star ratings and color labels, an adjustment brush to apply edits only to certain parts of an image, a loupe, Raw fine tuning, and chromatic aberration correction. DPReview's Jeff Keller said he was "not enthused about Photos" due to the missing features and "incredibly dumbed down interface", instead deciding to keep using Aperture and switch to Lightroom once it stopped working. Most reviewers felt the new Photos app was "not suitable for professional users".

French outlet MacGeneration and reporter Jason Snell noted that Apple continued selling Aperture, and that its sales pages failed to indicate that the application was discontinued. The sales pages were updated to note this in February 2015, and Aperture was removed from sale in April 2015, after the release of the Photos app.

=== Compatibility with later versions of macOS ===
The last version of macOS officially supported by Aperture is macOS 10.14 Mojave, since Aperture is a 32-bit application, which macOS 10.15 Catalina does not support.

A free, open-source application called Retroactive can modify Aperture to enable it to continue running on macOS Catalina and later macOS releases. Aperture remains fully functional except for the ability to play videos, export slideshows, and support for Photo Stream and iCloud Photo Sharing. Raw file may need to be reprocessed before they can be opened. Through Retroactive, Aperture is compatible with macOS Tahoe but needs at least Retroactive version 3.0 or higher.

== See also ==
- Comparison of image viewers
- Comparison of raster graphics editors
- iPhoto
