= IPhoto =

Digital photograph manipulation software by Apple

iPhoto

- iPhoto 9.6 running on OS X Yosemite
- Developer: Apple
- Release: January 7, 2002; 24 years ago
- Final release: 9.6.1 / March 19, 2015; 11 years ago
- Operating system: macOS (10.1.2-10.14.6)
- Successor: Photos
- License: Proprietary
- Website: Apple.com (Archived October 23, 2013)

iPhoto is a discontinued image organizer and image editing application developed by Apple for OS X (now known as macOS) and iOS. It was included with every new Mac computer from the introduction of the iLife suite of digital media applications in 2003 until 2015, when it was discontinued and replaced by the Photos app.

== History ==
iPhoto was announced at Macworld 2002, during which Steve Jobs also announced that Mac OS X would be the default operating system on all new Macs, and revealed new iMac and iBook models.

The first version of iPhoto was released on January 7, 2002 as a free download. It required a Mac computer with a built-in USB port running Mac OS X 10.1.2 or newer. Four months later iPhoto 1.1 was released, also for free.

In 2003, iPhoto 2 was released as part of the then-new iLife suite alongside iMovie, iDVD and iTunes. iPhoto, as part of the suite, was bundled with every new Mac computer until it was discontinued in 2015.

On March 7, 2012, Apple CEO Tim Cook announced an iOS-native version of iPhoto alongside the third-generation iPad.

With the release of OS X Mavericks in 2013, a new version of iPhoto was released exclusively to the Mac App Store. Existing users of iPhoto '11 could upgrade to this new version for free. Another update was released in 2014 alongside OS X Yosemite.,

On June 27, 2014, Apple announced that they would cease development of iPhoto and transition users to a new Photos app. On April 8, 2015, Apple released an update for OS X Yosemite, version 10.10.3, which included the new Photos app. iPhoto, as well as Apple's professional-oriented Aperture software, were both discontinued and removed from the Mac App Store. Users who previously purchased them can still re-download them.

macOS Mojave was the last version to support iPhoto. A free, open-source application called Retroactive can enable it to run on macOS versions up to and including macOS Golden Gate (27) but probably not later systems.

== Features ==
=== Mac version ===
iPhoto is designed to allow the importing of pictures from digital cameras, local storage devices such as USB flash drives, CDs, DVDs and hardrives to a user's iPhoto Library. Almost all digital cameras are recognized without additional software. iPhoto supports most common image file formats, including several Raw image formats. iPhoto also supports videos from cameras, but editing is limited to trimming clips.

After photos are imported, they can be titled, labeled, sorted and organized into groups known as "events". Basic editing functionality is included in iPhoto, including cropping, resizing, brightness and contrast adjustments, and a red-eye filter. iPhoto does not provide the comprehensive editing functionality of professional-oriented software and cannot be used with raw images.

Photo albums can be made into dynamic slideshows with the option to add music imported from iTunes. Photos could be shared via iMessage, Mail, Facebook, Flickr and Twitter, however iPhoto can no longer connect to these services due to its age. Creating and sharing Photo Streams on iCloud was possible until the feature was removed from iCloud. In some markets, professional photo printing and various products such as books, cards and calendars could be purchased through iPhoto until the services were discontinued.

iPhoto is able to sync photo albums to any iPod with a color display. These iPods often supported an audio/video adapter to allow photos to be displayed along with music on a television or projector.

=== iOS version ===
At an Apple media event on March 7, 2012, Apple CEO Tim Cook announced a new version of iPhoto for iOS. iPhoto for iOS was made available that day on the App Store for US$4.99, alongside the already-released iMovie and GarageBand for iOS. It officially supports the iPhone 4 and later, iPod Touch (4th and 5th generations), iPad 2 and later and iPad Mini (1st and 2nd generations), but users discovered that it could be installed manually on older devices using Apple's iPhone Configuration Utility.

iPhoto for iOS offers a feature set comparable to the Mac version. It can organize photos that are synced to the device or taken with its camera. Editing features include color correction tools and photo effects, as well as cropping and straightening tools. iPhoto for iOS lacks tools for creating books, calendars, cards and ordering prints. It can, however, create digital photo collages called "Photo Journals" that could be uploaded to iCloud until the feature was discontinued.

iPhoto for iOS was highly praised for its tools, good performance and compatibility.

iPhoto for iOS was discontinued in 2014 and removed from the App Store. It cannot officially be run on iOS 8 or above.

== See also ==
- Comparison of image viewers
- Digital photography
