= Outline of Apple Inc. =

American multinational technology company

The following outline of Apple Inc. is a topical guide to the products, history, retail stores, corporate acquisitions, and personnel under the purview of the American multinational corporation.

Apple Inc. was founded as Apple Computer Company on April 1, 1976, to produce and market Steve Wozniak's Apple I personal computer. The company was incorporated by Wozniak and Steve Jobs in 1977. Apple became the first publicly traded U.S. company to be valued at over $1 trillion in August 2018, $2 trillion in August 2020, and at $3 trillion in January 2022. Since 2011, Apple has been the world's largest company by market capitalization except when Microsoft held the position between January and June 2024. As of March 2014, the company has 425 stores in 16 countries and an online store in 39 countries.

== Hardware ==
=== Mac ===
Mac, a family of personal computers made by Apple:

- MacBook – notebook lineup
  - MacBook Neo – entry-level notebook
  - MacBook Air – thin, lightweight notebook
  - MacBook Pro – pro notebook
- iMac – all-in-one consumer desktop
- Mac Mini – small form factor desktop
- Mac Studio – small form factor desktop workstation

=== iPhone ===
Apple's smartphone:

- iPhone 17e – Apple's entry-level iPhone
- iPhone 16 – 2024's iPhone
- iPhone 17 – 2025's iPhone
- iPhone Air – a lightweight iPhone
- iPhone 18 Pro and Pro Max – high-end iPhones
- iPhone Duo – a foldable iPhone

=== iPad ===
Apple's tablet lineup:

- iPad – the name for Apple's entry-level iPads
- iPad Air – a more powerful, higher-end iPad
- iPad Mini – smaller iPad
- iPad Pro – pro iPad

=== Apple Watch ===
Apple's smartwatch lineup:

- Apple Watch SE – entry-level model
- Apple Watch Series – higher-end model
  - Apple Watch Nike – sports smartwatch
  - Apple Watch Hermès – fashion smartwatch
- Apple Watch Ultra – rugged model with longer battery

=== Apple Vision Pro ===
The Apple Vision Pro is a mixed-reality headset and spatial computer.

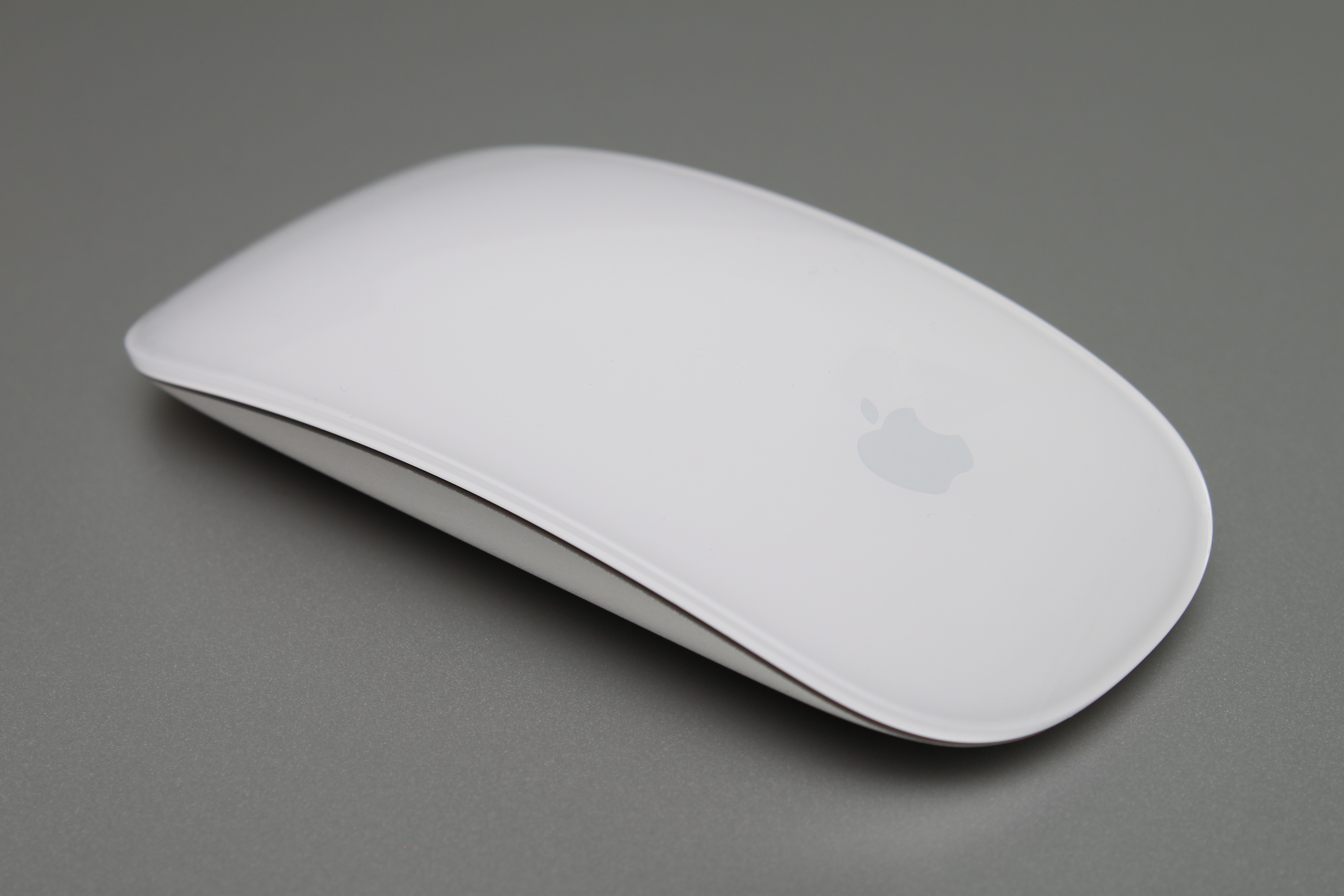
Magic Mouse

=== Accessories ===
- AirPods – wireless audio accessory lineup
  - AirPods – entry-level earbuds
  - AirPods Pro – noise-cancelling earbuds
  - AirPods Max – over-ear headphones
- Apple TV – digital media player
- Apple Pencil – digital stylus and input device for iPads
- HomePod – home speaker with Siri built-in
- HomePod Mini – smaller and less expensive HomePod
- HomeView – home speaker with screen and camera
- Siri Remote – Apple TV remote
- AirTag – tracking device
- Computer displays
  - Studio Display – consumer display
  - Studio Display XDR – pro display
- Computer peripherals
  - Magic Keyboard – Keyboard with optional fingerprint sensor for Macintosh computers
    - Magic Keyboard for iPad – Magic Keyboard version for the iPad Pro and iPad Air
  - Magic Mouse – Multi-touch mouse
  - Magic Trackpad – multi-touch external trackpad

== Software ==
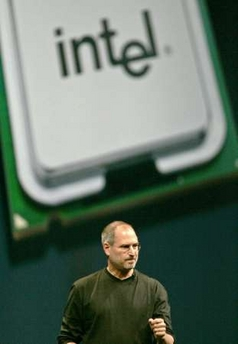
Steve Jobs talks about the transition to Intel in 2005.

=== Operating systems ===
- macOS – for Macs
  - List of built-in macOS apps – apps built-in to macOS
  - List of Mac software – a list of applications for macOS
  - List of Mac games – a list of games for macOS
  - Architecture of macOS – macOS's architecture
  - macOS version history – macOS's version history
- iOS – for iPhones
- iPadOS – for iPads
- watchOS – for Apple Watch
- tvOS – for Apple TV
- audioOS – for HomePods
- visionOS – for Apple Vision Pro

== Services ==
=== Consumer-facing ===
- Apple Arcade – on-demand game service
- Apple Card – credit card
- Apple Fitness+ – guided workouts
- Apple Music – music streaming service
- Apple News+ – premium news service
- Apple Podcasts – podcast service
- Apple TV – video streaming service
- iCloud – consumer cloud service
- iTunes Store – digital media store

=== Back-end ===
- iTunes Connect – service to upload content to the iTunes Store and Apple Books

== Developers ==
- App Store – app distribution service
  - iOS app approvals – app review and approval process
  - Mac App Store – app distribution service for macOS
- Apple Developer – Apple's developer network
- WWDC – Apple's yearly developer conference

=== Apps ===
- Instruments – app performance analyzer
- Xcode – integrated development environment (IDE)

=== APIs ===
- CloudKit – allows developers to build iCloud sync into their apps
- Cocoa – Apple's application frameworks for macOS
  - Foundation Kit – Apple's core framework API for macOS, iOS, and iPadOS
  - AppKit – Apple's user interface API for macOS
- Cocoa Touch – Apple's application frameworks for iOS and iPadOS
  - Foundation Kit
  - UIKit – Apple's user interface API for iOS and iPadOS
- GymKit – protocol for communication between Apple Watch and gym equipment
- HealthKit – APIs to integrate with Apple's Health app
- HomeKit – home automation framework
- Metal – Apple's graphics API on all platforms
- WebKit – open-source browser engine

== Retail ==
- Apple Store – worldwide chain of over 500 retail stores
- Genius Bar – tech support and repair service at Apple Stores
- Apple Authorized Service Provider – Apple-authorized resellers and repair shops
- AppleCare+ – warranty and accidental damage support plan for iPhone, iPad and Mac
- Apple certification programs – IT professional certifications for Apple products

== History ==
- History of Apple Inc. – company history
  - Apple Computer, Inc. v. Microsoft Corporation – a 1994 copyright infringement lawsuit
- List of Apple products – a timeline of all Apple products
- Develop – Apple's in-house developers' magazine (between January 1990 and March 1997)

=== Mac history ===
- Mac transition to Intel processors – the transition from PowerPC to Intel x86 processors
- Mac transition to Apple silicon – the transition from Intel to Apple silicon processors
- List of Mac models – list of all Macs throughout history
- Timeline of the Apple II series – a timeline of Apple II computers

==== Defunct displays ====
- Apple Studio Display – LCD and CRT display lineup (1998–2004)
- Apple Cinema Display – defunct display lineup (1999–2011)
- Apple Thunderbolt Display – 27-inch computer monitor (2011–2016)
- Pro Display XDR – 32-inch computer monitor (2019–2026)

=== iPhone history ===
- History of the iPhone – history of Apple's iPhone
- List of iPhone models - list of all iPhone devices

=== Defunct products ===
- iPod – defunct portable music player lineup
  - iPod Classic – high-end iPod (2001–2014)
  - iPod Mini – smaller iPod (2004–2005)
  - iPod Nano – smallest iPod (2005–2017)
  - iPod Touch – iOS-based iPod (2007–2022)
- Newton – defunct personal digital assistant (PDA) lineup, the first ones with handwriting recognition
- Xserve – defunct rack-mounted server lineup
- Mac Pro – customizable desktop workstation

=== Defunct software ===
- Aperture – professional photo editing app (2005–2015)
- Mac OS – the Macintosh operating system preceding macOS (1984–2001)
  - Mac OS memory management – Mac OS memory management details
  - System 6 – released in 1988
  - System 7 – released in 1991
  - Copland – System 7's scrapped successor (1994–1996)
  - Mac OS 8 – released in 1997
  - Mac OS 9 – released in 1999
- Xsan – a storage area network for macOS

=== Defunct protocols ===
- AFP – defunct disk sharing network protocol
- AppleTalk – defunct local networking protocol (1985–2009)

=== Ancillary operating systems ===
- A/UX – short-lived commercial OS merging System 7's GUI and application layer atop UNIX on select 68k Macintoshes
- MkLinux – a libre experiment in microkernel engineering (1996–2002)

== Technologies and protocols ==
- AirDrop – Mac and iOS filesharing protocol
- Apple Lossless – open-source lossless audio codec
- Bonjour – Apple's implementation of Zeroconf
- CarPlay – a standard for connecting to cars

== Personnel ==
=== Founders ===
- Steve Jobs – 1976–1985, 1997–2011 – Co-founder, chairman, CEO
- Steve Wozniak – 1976–1985 – Co-founder, Engineer (ceremonial role; 1985–current)
- Ronald Wayne – 1976 – Co-founder (briefly; 2 weeks).

=== CEOs ===
- John Ternus – 2026–current
  - Former CEOs:
    - Michael Scott – 1977–1981
    - Mike Markkula – 1981–1983
    - John Sculley – 1983–1993
    - Michael Spindler – 1993–1996
    - Gil Amelio – 1996–1997
    - Steve Jobs – 1997–2011
    - Tim Cook – 2011–2026

=== Board of directors ===
- Tim Cook – 2011–current – executive chair
- Arthur D. Levinson – 2000–current – lead independent director
- Andrea Jung – 2008–current – president and CEO of Grameen America
- Ronald Sugar – 2010–current – former CEO of Northrop Grumman
- John Ternus – 2026–current – CEO
- Susan Wagner – 2014–current – BlackRock founding partner and director
- Alex Gorsky – 2021–current – former chairman and CEO of Johnson & Johnson
- Monica C. Lozano – 2021–current – former president and CEO of College Futures Foundation
- Wanda Austin – 2024–current – former president and CEO of The Aerospace Corporation

==== Former board members ====
- Jerry York – 1997–2010 – former CFO of IBM and Chrysler
- Bill Campbell – 1997–2016 – former chairman and CEO of Intuit
- Millard Drexler – 1999–2015 – former chairman and CEO, J. Crew
- Bob Iger – 2011–2019 – former president and CEO, The Walt Disney Company
- Al Gore – 2003–2024 – 45th Vice President of the United States
- James A. Bell – 2015–2024 – former CFO of Boeing

=== Executives ===
- John Ternus – 2001–current – CEO (previously SVP of Hardware Engineering)
- Sabih Khan – 1995–current – COO (previously SVP of Operations)
- Kevan Parekh – 2013–current – CFO
- Jennifer Newstead – 2025–current – SVP and General Counsel
- Greg "Joz" Joswiak – 1986–current – SVP Worldwide Marketing
- Craig Federighi – 1996–1999, 2009–current – SVP Software Engineering.
- Eddy Cue – 1989–current – SVP Services and Health.
- Johny Srouji – 2008–current – Chief Hardware Officer
- Deirdre O'Brien – 1991–current – SVP Retail + People

==== Former executives ====
- Peter Oppenheimer – 1996–2014 – SVP and CFO
- Henri Lamiraux – 1990–2013 – iOS (previously Mac OS then OS X) Software Engineering VP
- Scott Forstall – 1996–2012 – SVP of iOS Software.
- Ron Johnson – 2000–2011 – SVP of Retail Operations.
- John Browett – 2012–2012 – SVP of Retail. Former CEO of Dixons.
- Mark Papermaster – 2008–2010 – SVP of Devices Hardware Engineering.
- Bertrand Serlet – 1997–2011 – SVP of Software Engineering
- Sina Tamaddon – 1997–2009— SVP of Applications
- Angela Ahrendts – 2014–2019 – SVP of Retail. Formerly CEO of Burberry
- Jony Ive – 1992–2019 – CDO (previously SVP of Industrial Design)
- Bruce Sewell – 2009–2017 – General Counsel
- Dan Riccio – 1998–2024 – former SVP of Hardware Engineering, later worked on unnamed project
- Phil Schiller – 1997–current – currently an Apple Fellow (previously SVP of Worldwide Marketing)
- Bob Mansfield – 2005–2012 – SVP of Mac and Devices Hardware Engineering (later Technologies), from July 2013, retained for "special projects"
- Luca Maestri – 2013–current – currently VP of Corporate Services (previously CFO)
- John Giannandrea – 2018–2025 – SVP Machine Learning and AI Strategy
- Jeff Williams – 1998–2025 – COO
- Katherine L. Adams – 2017–2026 – SVP Government Affairs (previously General Counsel)

=== Other contributors ===
- Mark Davis, software engineer and language programmer who started his career at Apple

== Subsidiaries ==
- Braeburn Capital – Apple-owned asset management company
- FileMaker Inc. – Apple subsidiary that designs and releases database applications
- Kaleida Labs – (founded 1992) a partnership co-founded with IBM as a result of the historic 1991 AIM alliance, meant to explore the creation of multimedia platforms
- Taligent – (founded March 2, 1992), a partnership co-founded with IBM as a result of the historic 1991 AIM alliance, meant to bring the radically object-oriented operating system Pink to market

=== Mergers and acquisitions ===
- Apple Inc. mergers and acquisitions – a list of company mergers and acquisitions by Apple (in alphabetical order):
  - AlgoTrim – (bought August 2013), a Swedish data compression company, especially focused on still/video image compression, founded by Anders Berglund, Anders Holtsberg, and Martin Lindberg in 2005.
  - Anobit – (bought December 2011), an Israeli fabless flash memory company, founded by Ehud Weinstein, Ariel Maislos, and Ofir Shalvi in 2006.
  - AuthenTec – (bought July 2012), security hardware and software for PCs and mobile device company, founded in 1998.
  - Beats Electronics – (bought August 2014), music headphones and streaming service
  - Chomp – (bought February 2012), an app search engine company, founded by Ben Keighran and Cathy Edwards in 2009.
  - Cue – (bought October 2013), a personal assistant app company, founded by Daniel Gross and Robby Walker in 2010.
  - Emagic – (bought July 2002), music software and hardware company, best known for its music sequencer, Logic.
  - Embark – (bought August 2013), a startup company focused on developing transit information apps for user public transportation navigation in major US cities, founded by John Hering, David Hodge, Taylor Malloy, and Ian Leighton in 2011.
  - FingerWorks – (bought early 2005), a gesture recognition company, founded by John Elias and Wayne Westerman in 1998.
  - HopStop – (bought July 2013), an online transit guide with subway, bus directions, and maps, founded by Chinedu Echeruo in 2005.
  - Intrinsity – (bought April 2010), fabless semiconductor company, founded as EVSX in 1997 on the remnants of Exponential Technology, then renamed Intrinsity in 2000.
  - Lala – (bought December 2009), online music store company, founded by Bill Nguyen.
  - Locationary – (bought July 2013), a Canadian crowdsourced location data management company, founded by Grant Ritchie in 2009.
  - Matcha – (bought August 2013), a second screen TV/video startup, previously available as a media discovery iOS app (closed in May 2013), founded by Guy Piekarz, Ilan Ben Zeev, and Paul Petrick in September 2010.
  - NeXT – (bought December 1996), computer company, founded in 1985 by Apple Inc. co-founder Steve Jobs after he was fired from Apple the same year. Current macOS, iOS, watchOS, and tvOS operating systems are largely built on its programming environment standard, OpenStep. Early versions of Mac OS X Server (codename Rhapsody) were OPENSTEP with a Mac-look and feel.
  - Nothing Real – (bought February 2002), a high-end digital effects software development company for the feature film, broadcast and interactive gaming industries, founded by Allen Edwards and Arnaud Hervas in October 1996.
  - P.A. Semi – (bought April 2008), a fabless semiconductor company founded by Daniel W. Dobberpuhl in 2003.
  - Particle – (bought September 2012), a HTML5 web app company, founded by Ericson de Jesus, Cole Rise, and Aubrey Anderson in 2008.
  - Passif Semiconductor – (bought August 2013), an Oakland, California based semiconductor company specializing in low energy wireless chips, founded by Ben Cook and Axel Berny in 2007.
  - PrimeSense – (bought November 2013), an Israeli fabless semiconductor company specializing in 3D sensing, founded by Aviad Maizels, Alexander Shpunt, Ophir Sharon, Tamir Berliner and Dima Rais in 2005.
  - Redmatica – (bought June 2012), an Italian music editing software company, known for Keymap Pro sampler software, founded by Andrea Gozzi in 2004.
  - Silicon Color – (bought October 2006), "FinalTouch" color correction software and non-linear video editing software development company, now known as Apple's Final Cut Pro software.
  - Siri – (bought April 2010), an intelligent personal assistant and knowledge navigator software company, founded by Dag Kittlaus, Adam Cheyer, Tom Gruber, together with Norman Winarsky in 2007. Apple initially integrated the software into iOS, the later to the watchOS and tvOS platforms.
  - Spruce Technologies – (bought July 2001), a DVD authoring company, founded by Dr. Hiromu Soga in 1996.
  - Topsy – (bought December 2013), a US data analytics company, founded by Vipul Ved Prakash, Rishab Aiyer Ghosh, Gary Iwatani, and Justin Foutts in 2007.
  - WiFiSlam – (bought March 2013), an indoor location services company, founded by former Stanford students Darin Tay, Joseph Huang, Jessica Tsoong and Dave Millman in 2011.

== Design ==
- Design motifs – design elements intrinsic to Apple Inc. products.
- Apple Industrial Design Group (IDg) – the industrial design arm that crafts product design
- Typography of Apple Inc. – typography and typefacesused by Apple Inc. in its marketing and operating systems

== Media ==
- Media events – special events where Apple Inc. announce the release of their products and services. Usually, this is done by Apple's current CEO often featuring other executives, previously most notably Steve Jobs.
  - Stevenote – keynote addresses, usually held at the beginning of media events, where former CEO Steve Jobs would announce the release of new Apple products. Noted for his idiosyncratic style of presenting, and also for his "One More Thing..." surprise announcements at the end.
- Advertising – various Apple Inc. advertising techniques and campaigns.
  - 1984 (advertisement) – specific TV and print ad campaign, inferring how Mac computers will free users from tyrannies similar to those prophesied in the George Orwell novel Nineteen Eighty-Four. Launched the first Macintosh computer; the Macintosh 128K.
  - Think different – specific TV & print ad campaign, inferring how Macs do things differently (meaning better) to other computers used in the home and small to medium-sized businesses.
  - Get a Mac – TV ad campaign, humorously inferring the superior nature of a Mac vs. Windows PC.
  - iPod advertising – various iPod ad campaigns since its initial release in 2001.

== Apple-related ==
- Apple community – the many various online websites and offline groups where Apple Inc.'s products and services are discussed and analyzed, as well as future products rumored about.
- Apple Campus – the Cupertino, California-based set of buildings forming the basis of Apple Inc.'s main campus business headquarters, where most office staff are based. A new, mostly single building, called Apple Campus 2, opened in 2017.
- Apple litigation – various legal disputes the company has been involved in.
- Criticism of Apple Inc. – various criticisms leveled at Apple Inc.
- Mac transition to Intel processors – the process of Apple changing the CPU of Macintosh computers from PowerPC processors to Intel x86 processors, during 2006.
  - Apple–Intel architecture – the architecture of Intel-based Apple computers, using Intel x86 processors rather than the PowerPC and 68k processors used in their predecessors.
  - Universal binary – in Apple parlance, an executable file or application bundle that runs natively on either PowerPC or Intel-manufactured IA-32 or Intel 64-based Macs; it is an implementation of the concept more generally known as a fat binary.
    - Xslimmer – macOS utility application developed by LateNiteSoft, designed to tweak universal binaries applications by stripping the binary from either its PowerPC or Intel code (depending on the system architecture used), in order to save hard disk space.
  - Rosetta – a dynamic binary translator application for Mac OS X allowing many PowerPC apps to run on certain Intel-based Macs without modification. Released in 2006 for the transition from PowerPC to Intel processors on the Macintosh platform, but it was dropped in Lion so Snow Leopard is the last version of Mac OS X that is able to run PowerPC-only applications.
  - Mac 68k emulator – lower-level program, similar in purpose to Rosetta but instead used during the transition from 680x0 to PowerPC processors.
- Macintosh clone – a personal computer made by a manufacturer other than Apple, using (or compatible with) Macintosh firmware and system software.
  - Star Trek – code name of prototype project between Apple and Novell from February/March 1992 to 1993, which was to be a version of the classic Mac OS running as a GUI on Intel-compatible x86 PCs on top of Novell's next in-development version of OS, DR DOS.
  - OSx86/Hackintosh – (from OS X and x86) is a collaborative hacking project to run OS X on non-Apple PCs with x86 architecture and x86-64 compatible processors. Computers built to run this type of OS X are often known as a Hackintosh or Hackbook (respectively, portmanteaus of words "hack" with "Macintosh" or "notebook computers").
- After finishing college, Apple's SVP of Industrial Design and Human Interface, Jony Ive, co-founded a London design agency, Tangerine. After leaving Apple, he and colleague Marc Newson started new agency, LoveFrom.

== See also ==
- Outline of iOS
- Microsoft
- Pixar
