= Jeff Williams (Apple) =

American business executive (born 1963)

- Born: 1963 (age 62–63)
- Education: North Carolina State University (BS); Duke University (MBA)
- Occupation: Business executive
- Employer: Apple Inc.
- Known for: Former COO of Apple

Jeff Williams (born 1963) is an American business executive who was the chief operating officer of Apple Inc. between December 2015 and November 2025.

As a senior executive of Apple, Williams had a prominent role in launching new products and updates. He was widely considered to be a deputy to the company's chief executive, Tim Cook and his potential successor. In his role at Apple, he was responsible for the company's supply chain, the engineering of the Apple Watch and the company's AppleCare+ customer service.

== Education ==
Williams studied at Jesse O. Sanderson High School in Raleigh, North Carolina.

Williams received a Bachelor of Science with a major in mechanical engineering from North Carolina State University in 1985 and an MBA from Duke University.

== Career ==
Williams worked for IBM from 1985 to 1998 in a number of operations and engineering roles.

Williams joined Apple in 1998 as head of worldwide procurement, and in 2004 he was named vice president of operations. In 2007, he played a significant role in Apple's entry into the mobile phone market with the launch of the iPhone and he has led worldwide operations for iPod and iPhone since that time.

On December 17, 2015, he was appointed chief operating officer for Apple.

On June 27, 2019, with the announcement that Jony Ive was leaving Apple to form an independent design company, it was announced that Apple's design team leaders Evans Hankey, vice president of Industrial Design, and Alan Dye, vice president of Human Interface Design, will report to Jeff Williams.

On July 8, 2025, it was announced that Williams will step down as chief operations officer of Apple by the end of July 2025. He will stay within the company until his retirement later in 2025. Williams was succeeded by Sabih Khan.

== See also ==
- Steve Jobs
- Eddy Cue
- Dan Riccio
- Phil Schiller
- Craig Federighi
