= Apple car project =

Electric and self-driving car research and development project

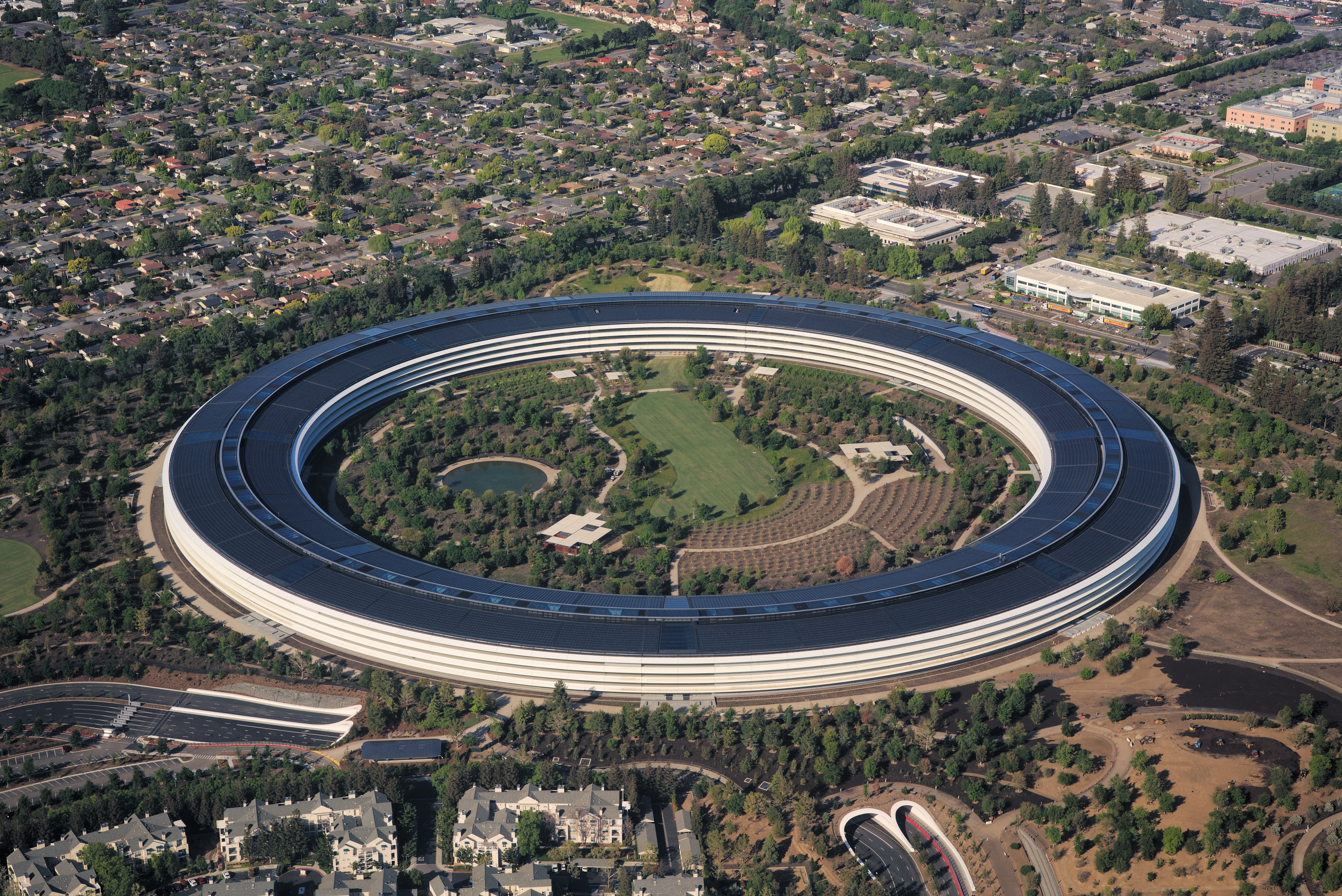
An aerial view of Apple Park, Cupertino

From 2014 until 2024, Apple undertook a research and development effort to develop an electric and self-driving car, codenamed "Project Titan". Apple never openly discussed any of its automotive research, but around 5,000 employees were reported to be working on the project as of 2018. In May 2018, Apple reportedly partnered with Volkswagen to produce an autonomous employee shuttle van based on the T6 Transporter commercial vehicle platform. In August 2018, the BBC reported that Apple had 66 road-registered driverless cars, with 111 drivers registered to operate those cars. In 2020, it was believed that Apple was still working on self-driving related hardware, software and service as a potential product, instead of actual Apple-branded cars. In December 2020, Reuters reported that Apple was planning on a possible launch date of 2024, but analyst Ming-Chi Kuo claimed it would not be launched before 2025 and might not be launched until 2028 or later.

In February 2024, Apple executives canceled their plans to release the autonomous electric vehicle, instead shifting resources on the project to the company's generative artificial intelligence efforts. The project had reportedly cost the company over $1 billion per year, with other parts of Apple collaborating and spending hundreds of millions of dollars in additional costs. Additionally, over 600 employees were laid off due to the cancellation of the project.

== Car details ==
The car project cycled through multiple designs over the years. Teams at Apple outside of the development project were involved in its development. People from the Apple silicon team were heavily involved in the car to design the processor used for its autonomy. At the time of cancellation, the chip was nearly finished, and had the equivalent processing power of four M2 Ultras combined. The microkernel for the car was named "safetyOS".

== Proposed collaborations and acquisitions ==
During the 2008–2010 automotive industry crisis, with car companies nearing collapse, Apple SVP Tony Fadell proposed to Jobs the idea of buying General Motors at a reduced price. The idea was abandoned partly because the company felt that it would be a bad look, and partly because of its focus on the iPhone.

In 2014, with renewed interest in the project, Apple's head of corporate development Adrian Perica met with Elon Musk several times with an interest in acquiring Tesla. Tim Cook, Apple's CEO, shut down these early negotiations, partly due to Apple's CFO (and former GM Europe CFO) Luca Maestri saying how difficult the car business was. Despite the failure, years later, then-hardware chief Dan Riccio and former Ford engineer and iPhone engineer Steve Zadesky returned to Musk to discuss ideas for a collaboration. A few more years later, as Tesla struggled to make its Model 3 sedan, Musk attempted to restart talks with Apple, but said Cook wouldn't meet.

Attempts to partner with Mercedes-Benz advanced somewhat further than those with Tesla. The plan was for Mercedes-Benz to manufacture the car and Apple to also provide Mercedes-Benz its self-driving platform and UI for other cars. Apple pulled out partly because it had confidence that it could successfully manufacture a car themselves, and partly over disagreements over controlling the user's experience and data. The talks lasted for more than a year.

The closest talks came to acquiring a car company were with McLaren. Some executives hoped that Jony Ive would be closer to Apple with that acquisition, following his reduced involvement in the company. BMW and Canoo, among others, were also in exploratory talks for an acquisition. Apple also met with Nissan and BYD Auto. Apple was concerned that integrating an automaker would be a disaster internally. Apple briefly partnered with Magna Steyr, a maker of low-volume vehicles for the project.

In 2018, Apple signed a deal with Volkswagen to make an autonomous shuttle for Apple employees at their new headquarters, Apple Park. Volkswagen's T6 transport vans were to be modified, keeping the chassis and wheels, but with replaced dashboards, seats, and other components. The deal, an interim effort, was shut down by Doug Field, the head of the project, who saw it as a distraction.

The Korea Economic Daily reported in 2021 that Hyundai was in early discussions with Apple to develop and produce self-driving electric cars jointly. Some weeks later, in late January, Apple announced some upper-level engineering changes, leading some Apple-watchers to speculate if Dan Riccio's "new chapter at Apple" might indicate leadership of the Titan project (or something altogether unrelated, such as augmented/virtual reality headset or deluxe noise-cancelling headphones). By early February, it appeared that Apple was close to a $3.59B deal with Hyundai to use its Kia Motors' West Point, Georgia manufacturing plant for the car, a fully autonomous machine without a driver's seat. However, in February 2021, Hyundai and Kia confirmed that they were not in talks with Apple to develop a car. Adding further credence to Apple's automotive aspirations, Business Insider Deutschland (Germany) reported that Apple had hired Porsche VP of Chassis Development, Dr. Manfred Harrer. After rumors coming from Financial Times about Apple talking to several Japanese car companies about the Apple Car project after the Hyundai-Kia rumor, Nissan came out to Reuters as saying it is not in any of these discussions. The next Apple Car speculation was that Apple was shopping around for Lidar navigation sensor suppliers for its project.

== History ==
=== 2014–2015 ===
The project was rumored to have been approved by Apple CEO Tim Cook in late 2014. For the project, Apple was rumored to have hired Johann Jungwirth, the former president and chief executive of Mercedes-Benz Research and Development North America, as well as at least one transmission engineer.

In February 2015, Apple board member Mickey Drexler stated that Apple co-founder and CEO Steve Jobs had plans to design and build a car and that discussions about the concept surfaced around the time that Tesla Motors debuted its first car in 2008. In May 2015, Apple investor Carl Icahn stated that he believed rumors that Apple would enter the automobile market in 2020, and that logically Apple would view this car as "the ultimate mobile device".

In August 2015, The Guardian reported that Apple were meeting with officials from GoMentum Station, a testing ground for connected and autonomous vehicles at the former Concord Naval Weapons Station in Concord, California. In September 2015, there were reports that Apple were meeting with self-driving car experts from the California Department of Motor Vehicles. According to The Wall Street Journal in September 2015, it will be a battery electric vehicle, initially lacking full autonomous driving capability, with a possible unveiling around 2019.

In October 2015, Tim Cook stated about the car industry: "It would seem like there will be massive change in that industry, massive change. You may not agree with that. That's what I think... We'll see what we do in the future. I do think that the industry is at an inflection point for massive change." Cook enumerated ways that the modern descendants of the Ford Model T would be shaken to the very chassis—the growing importance of software in the car of the future, the rise of autonomous vehicles, and the shift from an internal combustion engine to electrification.

In November 2015, various websites reported that suspected Apple front SixtyEight Research had attended an auto body conference in Europe. Also in November 2015, after unknown EV startup Faraday Future announced a $1 billion U.S. factory project, some speculated that it might be a front for Apple's secret car project. In late 2015, Apple contracted Torc Robotics to retrofit two Lexus SUVs with sensors in a project known internally as Baja.

=== 2016 ===
In 2016, Tesla Motors CEO Elon Musk stated that Apple will probably make a compelling electric car: "It's pretty hard to hide something if you hire over a thousand engineers to do it." In May 2016, reports were indicating Apple was interested in electric car charging stations.

The Wall Street Journal reported on July 25, 2016, that Apple had convinced retired senior hardware engineering executive Bob Mansfield to return and take over the Titan project. A few days later, on July 29, Bloomberg Technology reported that Apple had hired Dan Dodge, the founder and former chief executive officer of QNX, BlackBerry Ltd.’s automotive software division. According to Bloomberg, Dodge's hiring heralded a shift in emphasis at Apple's Project Titan, in which the company will prioritize creating software for autonomous vehicles. However, the story said that Apple would continue to develop a vehicle of its own. On September 9, The New York Times reported dozens of layoffs in an effort to reboot, presumably from a team still numbering around 1,000.

The following week, reports surfaced that Magna International, a contract vehicle manufacturer, had a small team working at Apple's Sunnyvale lab.

=== 2017 ===
After no new reports, car project news flared up again in mid-April 2017, as word spread that Apple was permitted to test autonomous vehicles on California roads. In mid-June, Tim Cook in an interview with Bloomberg TV said Apple was "focusing on autonomous systems" but not necessarily leading to an actual Apple car product, leaving speculation about Apple's role in the convergence of three disruptive "vectors of change": autonomous systems, electric vehicles and ride-sharing services.

In mid-August, various sources reported that the car project was focusing on autonomous systems, now expected to test its technology in the real world using a company-operated inter-campus shuttle service between the main Infinite Loop campus in Cupertino and various Silicon Valley offices, including the new Apple Park. Then at the end of August, around 17 former Titan team members, braking and suspension engineers with Detroit experience, were hired by autonomous vehicle startup Zoox.

October 2016 reports claimed the Titan project has a 2017 deadline to determine its fate - prove its practicality and viability, set a final direction.

In November 2017, Apple employees Yin Zhou and Oncel Tuzel published a paper on VoxelNet, which uses a convolutional neural network to detect three-dimensional objects using lidar.

Transportation/tech website Jalopnik reported in late November that Apple was recruiting automotive test engineering and tech talent for autonomous systems work and appeared to be secretly leasing, via third parties, a former Fiat Chrysler proving grounds site in Surprise, Arizona (originally Wittman). Also in 2017, The New York Times suggested that Apple had stopped developing its self-driving car. In response to such reports, Apple CEO Tim Cook acknowledged publicly that year that the company was working on autonomous-car technology.

=== 2018 ===
In January 2018, the company registered 27 self-driving vehicles with California's Department of Motor Vehicles.

While Apple attempted to keep its autonomous vehicles plans secret, regulatory filings did provide evidence of their project and related activities. In September 2018, Apple held the third-highest number of California autonomous vehicle permits with 70, behind GM's Cruise (175) and Alphabet's Waymo (88).

On July 7, 2018, a former Apple employee was arrested by the FBI for allegedly stealing trade secrets about Apple's self-driving car project. He was charged by federal prosecutors. The criminal complaint against the former employee revealed that at that time, Apple still had yet to openly discuss any of its self-driving research, with around 5,000 employees disclosed on the project.

In August 2018, Doug Field, formerly Senior VP Engineering at Tesla, became the leader of Apple's Titan team.

On August 24, 2018, it was reported that one of Apple's self-driving car had apparently been involved in a crash, when it was rear-ended during road-testing. The crash occurred while the car was at a stop, waiting to merge into traffic about 3.5 miles from Apple's headquarters in Cupertino, with no reported injuries. At the time, the BBC reported that Apple had 66 road-registered driverless cars, with 111 drivers registered to operate those cars.

In August 2018, there were reports about an Apple patent of a system that warns riders ahead of time about what an autonomous car would do, purportedly to alleviate the discomfort of surprise.

=== 2019 ===
In January 2019, Apple laid off more than 200 employees from their 'Project Titan' autonomous vehicle team.

In June 2019, Apple acquired autonomous vehicle startup Drive.ai.

=== 2020 ===
In early December, Bloomberg reported that Apple artificial intelligence lead John Giannandrea is overseeing Apple Car development as prior lead Bob Mansfield has retired. A few weeks later, Reuters reported that Apple was working towards a possible launch date of 2024 according to two unnamed insiders.

=== 2021 ===
An industry source told The Korea Times that Apple was working in Korea to build its supply chain. Later in 2021, Apple was reportedly in talks with Toyota as well as Korean partners for production to commence in 2024. After Doug Field departed the project and joined Ford, Kevin Lynch, the wearables chief at Apple, was appointed to lead the project.

=== 2022–2024 ===
Bloomberg reported that Apple had given up on building a fully self-driving car and was instead looking to bring a car capable of self-driving only on highways. Its price would be below 100,000 dollars. TrendForce reported that microLED would be used in the car. Apple had 66 road-registered driverless cars, with 152 drivers registered to operate those cars.

In January 2024, Bloomberg reports suggested that Apple further delayed the car's release date to 2028, significantly scaling down its plans for self-driving and instead focusing on basic driver-assistance features similar to existing electric vehicles.

On February 27, 2024, Apple executives made an internal announcement that the entire car project was being cancelled, with most resources moving to work on Apple's generative AI projects.

In April 2024, Apple laid off more than 600 employees in Santa Clara, California. Most of the offices impacted by the layoffs were previously linked to project Titan and one, 3250 Scott Blvd, code named Aria, was developing the microLED screens.

== Purported employees and affiliates ==
- Jamie Carlson, a former engineer on Tesla's Autopilot self-driving car program. After he left Tesla for Apple, he left Apple to work with Chinese automaker Nio on their NIO Pilot autonomous driving platform. Most recently he has returned to Apple special projects.
- Megan McClain, a former Volkswagen AG engineer with expertise in automated driving.
- Vinay Palakkode, a graduate researcher at Carnegie Mellon University, a hub of automated driving research.
- Xianqiao Tong, an engineer who developed computer vision software for driver assistance systems at microchip maker Nvidia Corp NVDA.O.
- Paul Furgale, former deputy director of the Autonomous Systems Lab at the Swiss Federal Institute of Technology in Zurich.
- Sanjai Massey, an engineer with experience in developing connected and automated vehicles at Ford and several suppliers.
- Stefan Weber, a former Bosch engineer with experience in video-based driver assistance systems.
- Lech Szumilas, a former Delphi research scientist with expertise in computer vision and object detection.
- Anup Vader, formerly Caterpillar autonomous systems thermal engineer, who left Apple in April 2019 to join Zoox autonomous vehicle startup.
- Doug Betts, former global quality leader at Fiat Chrysler.
- Johann Jungwirth, former CEO of Mercedes-Benz Research & Development, North America, Inc. – left for VW in Nov. 2015.
- Mujeeb Ijaz, a former Ford Motor Co. engineer, who founded A123 Systems's Venture Technologies division, which focused on materials research, electrical battery cell product development and advanced concepts (who helped recruited four to five staff researchers from A123, a battery technology company)
- Nancy Sun, formerly vice president of electrical engineering at electric motorcycle company Mission Motors in San Francisco.
- Mark Sherwood, formerly director of powertrain systems engineering at Mission Motors.
- Eyal Cohen, formerly vice president of software and electrical engineering at Mission Motors.
- Jonathan Cohen, former director of Nvidia's deep learning software. Nvidia uses deep learning in its Nvidia Drive PX platform, which is used in driver assistance systems.
- Chris Porritt – former Tesla vice president of vehicle engineering and former Aston Martin chief engineer.
- Luigi Taraborrelli, a former Lamborghini executive for 20 years.
- Alex Hitzinger is a German engineer who until March 31, 2016, was the technical director of Porsche's LMP1 project. He previously worked as Head of Advanced Technologies for the Red Bull and Toro Rosso Formula One teams. In January 2019 he left to head the technical VW commercial vehicles department.
- Benjamin Lyon, sensor expert, manager and founding team member, who reported directly to Doug Field, left Apple for a chief engineer position at "satellite and space startup" Astra in Feb 2021.
- Weibao Wang, software engineer indicted for theft and attempted theft of trade secrets.
- Doug Field, VP of special projects at Apple - de facto head of the car project. Left to join Ford

== See also ==
- CarPlay – Protocol for connecting Apple hardware to car radios
- Xiaomi SU7
