= Scott Forstall =

American software engineer (born 1969)

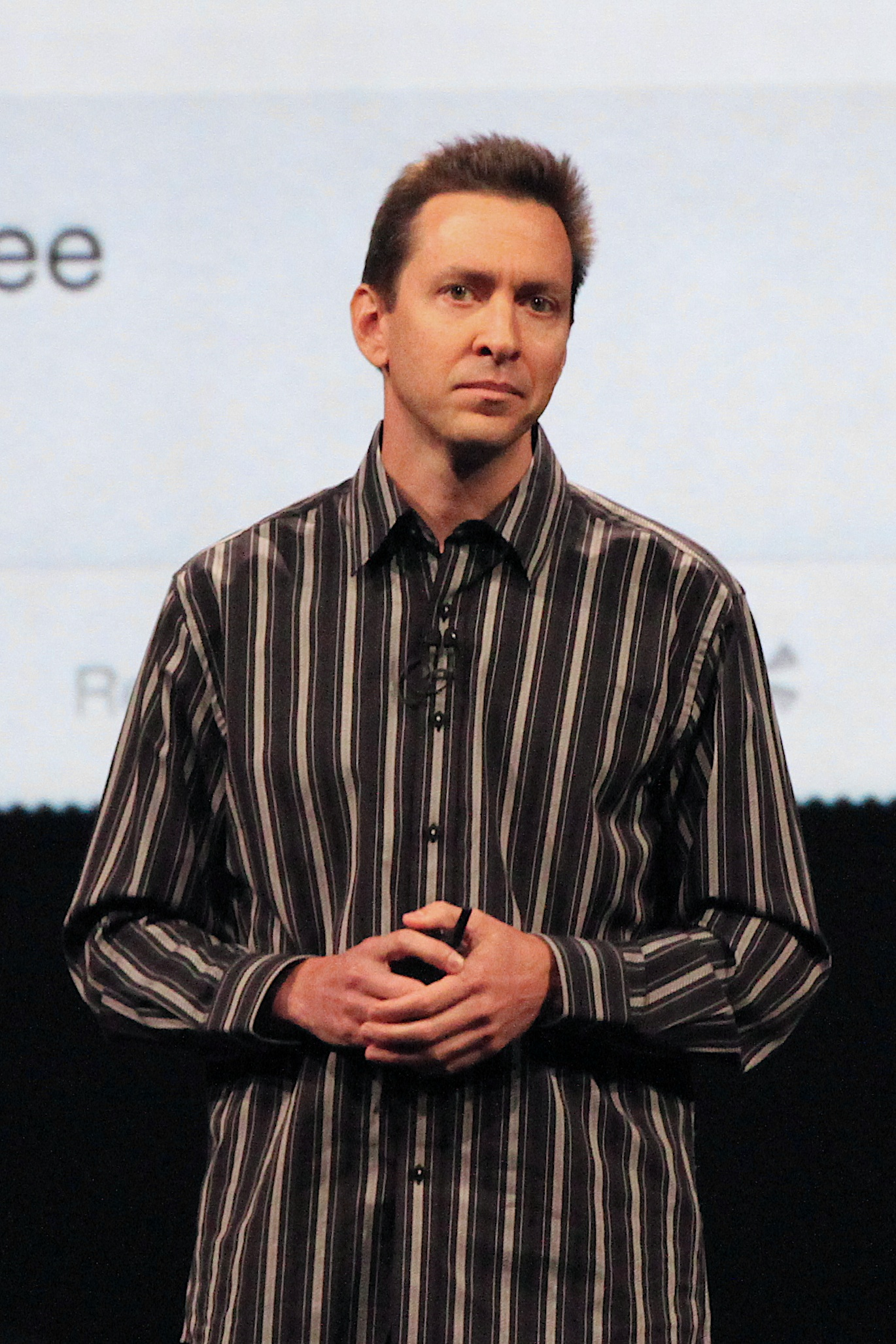
- Forstall in 2012
- Born: December 27, 1969 (age 56); Washington, US
- Education: Stanford University (B.S., M.S.)
- Known for: Former SVP at Apple Inc.

Scott James Forstall (born August 28, 1969) is an American software engineer, known for leading the original software development team for the iPhone and iPad. Having spent his career first at NeXT and then Apple, he was the senior vice president (SVP) of iOS software at Apple from 2007 until October 2012.

After leaving Apple, Forstall has been a Broadway producer known for co-producing the Tony Award-winning Fun Home and Eclipsed with his wife Molly Forstall, among others.

== Early life and education ==
Forstall grew up in Kitsap County, Washington, the second-born of three boys to a registered-nurse mother Jeanne and an engineer father Tom Forstall. His older brother Bruce is also a senior software design engineer, at Microsoft.

A gifted student for whom skills such as programming "came easily where they were difficult for others", Forstall qualified for advanced-placement science and math class in junior high school, and gained experience programming on Apple IIe computers.

He was skipped forward a year, entering Olympic High School in Bremerton, Washington, early where classmates recall his immersion in competitive chess, history, and general knowledge, on occasion competing at the state level. He achieved a 4.0 GPA and earned the position of valedictorian, a position he shared with a classmate, Molly Brown, who would later become his wife. He had established the goal of being a "designer of high-tech electronics equipment", as he proclaimed in an interview with a local newspaper.

Enrolling at Stanford University, he graduated in 1991 with a degree in symbolic systems. The next year he received his master's degree in computer science, also from Stanford. During his time at Stanford, Forstall was a member of the Phi Kappa Psi fraternity.

== Career ==
=== NeXT / Apple ===
Forstall joined Steve Jobs's NeXT in 1992 and stayed when it was purchased by Apple in 1997. Forstall was then placed in charge of designing user interfaces for a reinvigorated Macintosh line. In 2000, Forstall became a leading designer of the Mac's new Aqua user interface, known for its water-themed visual cues such as translucent icons and reflections, making him a rising star in the company. He was promoted to SVP in January 2003. During this period, he supervised the creation of the Safari web browser. Lisa Melton, a senior developer on the Safari team, credited Forstall for being willing to trust the instincts of his team and respecting their ability to develop the browser in secret.

In 2005, when Jobs began planning the iPhone, he had a choice to either "shrink the Mac, which would be an epic feat of engineering, or enlarge the iPod". Jobs favored the former approach but pitted the Macintosh and the iPod team, led by Forstall and Tony Fadell respectively, against each other in an internal competition. Forstall won that fierce competition to create iOS. The decision enabled the success of the iPhone as a platform for third-party developers: using a well-known desktop operating system as its basis allowed the many third-party Mac developers to write software for the iPhone with minimal retraining. Forstall was also responsible for creating a software developer's kit for programmers to build iPhone apps, as well as an App Store within iTunes.

In 2006, Forstall became responsible for Mac OS X releases after Avie Tevanian stepped down as the company's Chief Software Technology Officer and before being named SVP of iPhone Software. Forstall received credit as he "ran the iOS mobile software team like clockwork and was widely respected for his ability to perform under pressure".

He has spoken publicly at Apple Worldwide Developers Conferences, including talks about Mac OS X Leopard in 2006 and iPhone software development in 2008, later after the release of iPhone OS 2.0 and iPhone 3G, and on January 27, 2010, at Apple's 2010 iPad keynote. At WWDC 2011, Forstall introduced iOS 5. Forstall also appears in the iOS 5 video, narrating about three-quarters of the clip, and in almost every major Apple iOS special event. At the "Let's talk iPhone" event launching the iPhone 4S, he took the stage to demonstrate the phone's Siri voice recognition technology, which was originally developed at SRI International.

=== Departure from Apple ===
The aftermath of the release of iOS 6, on September 19, 2012, proved a troubled period for Apple. The newly introduced Maps application, designed completely in-house by Apple, was criticized for being underdeveloped, buggy and lacking in detail. In addition, the clock app used a design based on the trademarked Swiss railway clock, which Apple had failed to license, forcing Apple to pay Swiss railways a reported $21 million in compensation. In October, Apple reported third-quarter results in which revenues and profits grew less than predicted, the second quarter in a row that the company missed analysts' expectations.

On October 29, 2012, Apple announced in a press release "that Scott Forstall will be leaving Apple [in 2013] and will serve as an advisor to CEO Tim Cook in the interim." Forstall's duties were divided among four other Apple executives: design SVP Jonathan Ive assumed leadership of Apple's Human Interface team, Craig Federighi became the new head of iOS software engineering, services chief Eddy Cue took over responsibilities for Maps and Siri, and Bob Mansfield (previously SVP of hardware engineering) "unretired" to oversee a new technology group. On the same day, John Browett, who was SVP of retail, was dismissed immediately after only six months on the job.

Neither Forstall nor any other Apple executive has commented publicly on his departure beyond the initial press statement, but it is generally presumed that Forstall left his position involuntarily. All information about the reasons for his departure therefore come from anonymous sources. Cook's aim since becoming CEO has been reported to be building a culture of harmony, which meant "weeding out people with disagreeable personalities—people Jobs tolerated and even held close, like Forstall," although Apple Senior Director of Engineering Michael Lopp "believes that Apple's ability to innovate came from tension and disagreement." Steve Jobs was referred to as the "decider" who had the final say on products and features while he was CEO, reportedly keeping the "strong personalities at Apple in check by always casting the winning vote or by having the last word", so after Jobs' death many of these executive conflicts became public. Forstall had such a poor relationship with Ive and Mansfield that he could not be in a meeting with them unless Cook mediated; reportedly, Forstall and Ive did not cooperate at any level. Being forced to choose between the two, Cook reportedly chose to retain Ive since Forstall was not collaborative. Forstall was very close to and referred to as a mini-Steve Jobs, so Jobs' death left Forstall without a protector. Forstall was also referred to as the CEO-in-waiting by Fortune magazine and the book Inside Apple (written by Adam Lashinsky), a profile that made him unpopular at Apple. Forstall was said to be responsible for the departure of Jean-Marie Hullot (CTO of applications) in 2005 and Tony Fadell (SVP of hardware engineering) in 2008; Fadell remarked in an interview with the BBC that Forstall's firing was justified and he "got what he deserved". Jon Rubinstein, Fadell's predecessor as SVP of hardware, also had a strained relationship with Forstall. After Jobs' death in 2011, it had been reported that Forstall was trying to gather power to challenge Cook.

The Siri intelligent personal voice assistant that Forstall introduced in September 2011 has received a mixed reception with some observers regarding it as a "flop". Forstall was vigorously criticized after the new Maps app, introduced in iOS 6, received criticism for inaccuracies that were not up to Apple standards. According to Adam Lashinsky of Fortune, when Apple issued a formal apology for the errors in Maps, Forstall refused to sign it. Under long-standing practice at Apple, Forstall was the "directly responsible individual" for Maps, and his refusal to sign the apology convinced Cook that Forstall had to go.

Forstall's skeuomorphic design style, strongly advocated by former CEO Steve Jobs, was reported to have also been controversial and divided the Apple design team. In a 2012 interview, Ive, then head of hardware design only, refused to comment on the iOS user interface, "In terms of those elements you're talking about, I'm not really connected to that."

=== Present ===
Forstall did not make public appearances after his departure from Apple for a number of years. A report in December 2013 said that he had been concentrating on travel, advising charities, and providing informal advice to some small companies.

On April 17, 2015, Forstall made his first tweet, which revealed that he is a co-producer of the Broadway version of the musical Fun Home. It was his first public appearance since departing from Apple in 2012. On June 7, 2015, the Forstall-produced musical won five Tony Awards.

In 2015, Forstall was reported to be working as an advisor with Snap Inc.

On June 20, 2017, Forstall gave his first public interview after leaving Apple. He was interviewed in the Computer History Museum by John Markoff about the creation of the iPhone on the 10th anniversary of its sales launch.

On April 18, 2020, Forstall announced that he was a producer for the Broadway musical Hadestown. The musical went on to win 8 Tony Awards.

On May 20, 2020, Forstall made an appearance in Code.org's online Break event.

On December 17, 2020, Forstall was revealed to be one of the co-creators of WordArt alongside Apple engineer Nat Brown, while interning for Microsoft in 1991.

In April 2021, Forstall served as one of Apple's witnesses on Epic Games v. Apple.

== See also ==
- Outline of Apple Inc. (personnel)
- History of Apple Inc.
- List of Stanford University people
