= Uppingham Community College =

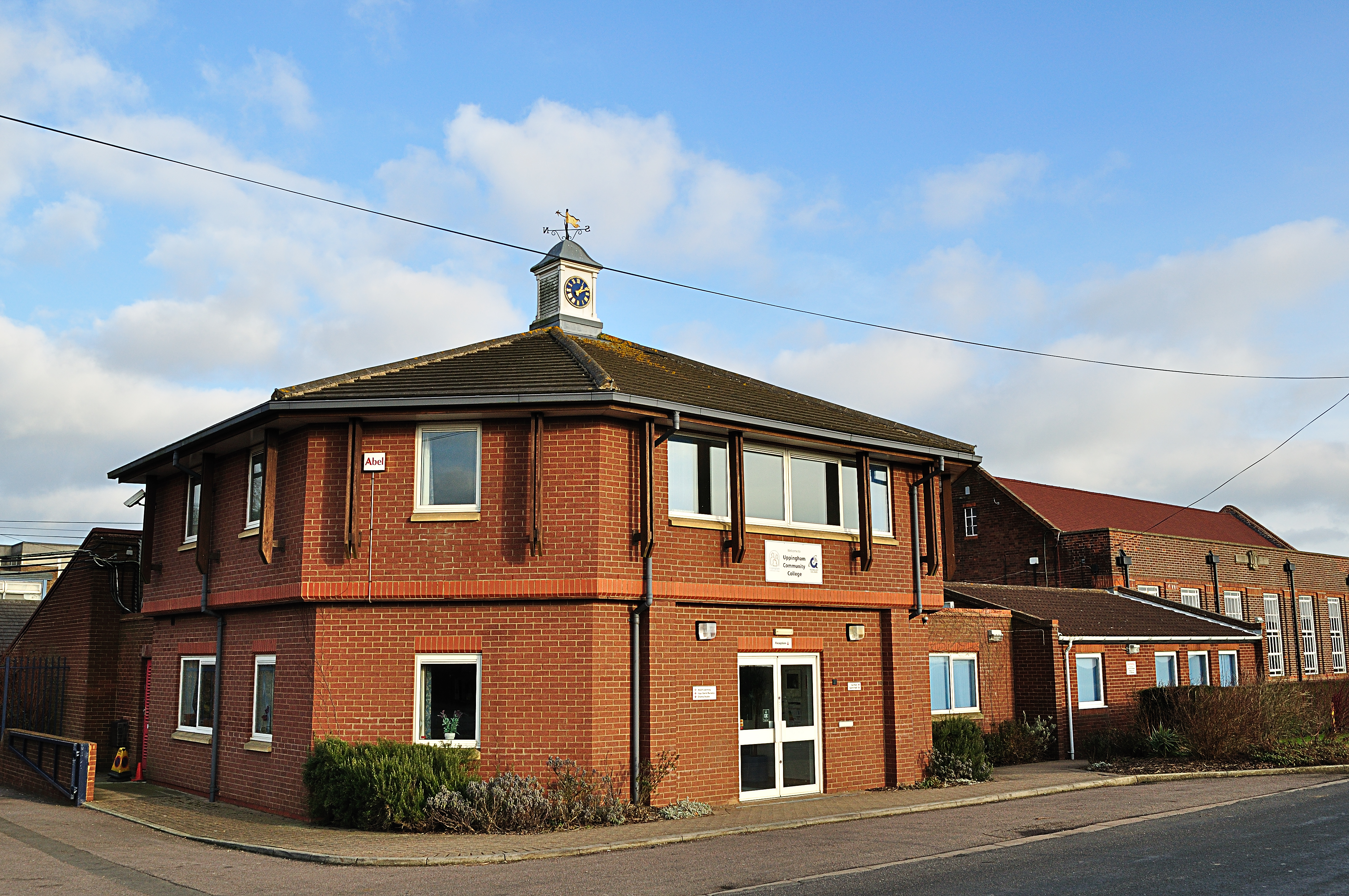

Location
- London Road; Uppingham, Rutland, LE15 9TJ; England
- 52.5801°N 0.7223°W

Information
- Type: Academy
- Department for Education URN: 136629 Tables
- Ofsted: Reports
- Principal: David Anderson
- Gender: Mixed
- Age: 11 to 16
- Website: http://www.uppinghamcollege.org.uk/

Uppingham Community College is a mixed secondary school located in Uppingham in the English county of Rutland.

It was previously a community school administered by Rutland County Council. Uppingham Community College then briefly became a foundation school before being converted to academy status in April 2011. However the school continues to coordinate with Rutland County Council for admissions.

Uppingham Community College offers GCSEs, BTECs and vocational courses as programmes of study for pupils. The school specialises in STEM (Science, Technology, Engineering and Mathematics), and has additional resources and programmes of study to support the specialism.

== History ==
The school opened in 1920 as Uppingham Central School, subsequently Uppingham Secondary Modern School. It became a comprehensive school when Rutland went comprehensive in 1972.

== Notable former pupils ==
- John Browett, chief executive since January 2016 of Dunelm Group, from March 2013 - February 2015 of Monsoon Accessorize, and from 1999 to 2004 of Tesco.com
