= Outline of iOS =

Overview of and topical guide to iOS

The following outline is provided as an overview of and topical guide to iOS:

iOS – mobile operating system developed and distributed by Apple Inc. Originally released in 2007 for the iPhone and iPod Touch, it has since been extended to support other Apple devices such as the iPad and Apple TV. Unlike Windows CE (Mobile and Phone) and Android, Apple does not license iOS for installation on non-Apple hardware.

== Devices ==
- iOS devices
  - iPhone
    - List of iPhone models
  - iPod Touch
  - iPad
    - List of iPad models
  - Apple TV (tvOS)
  - Apple Watch (watchOS)

== Releases ==
- iOS
  - iOS version history
- iPadOS
  - iPadOS version history
- watchOS
- tvOS

== Features ==
- Interface
  - Direct manipulation
    - Multi-touch
      - Types of use
        - Swiping
        - Tapping
        - Reverse pinching
        - Pinching
    - Accelerometer
      - Types of use
        - Shaking
        - Rotation
        - Steering
- Other elements
  - SpringBoard (Home Screen)
  - Multitasking
  - Apple Push Notification Service
  - Notification Center
  - Control Center

== Applications ==
- iOS#Applications
- Software Development Kit

== History ==
History of the iPhone

- iOS version history
- List of iPhone models
- List of iPad models
- History of Apple

== General concepts ==
- Hardware
- Software
  - Interface
  - SDK
  - Jailbreaking-hacking

== Personnel ==
- Steve Jobs, former CEO
- Tim Cook, CEO
- Jonathan Ive, senior vice president of design
- Scott Forstall, former senior vice president of iOS software

== See also ==
- Apple Inc.
- Macintosh
