= ITunes (disambiguation) =

iTunes may refer to:

- iTunes, a media player by Apple
- iTunes Connect, an Apple service for developers
- iTunes Match, an iCloud-based music hosting service by Apple
- iTunes Radio, an online radio service by Apple
- iTunes Remote, a software remote for the Apple TV Second generation or later
- iTunes Store, an online media store by Apple
- iTunes App Store
- "I-Tunes song", a song by Homeboy Sandman from his 2008 album Actual Factual Pterodactyl
