= Peter Oppenheimer =

Apple executive

- Born: January 14, 1963 (age 63)
- Education: California Polytechnic State University (BA); Santa Clara University (MBA)
- Occupation: Business executive
- Known for: 1st CFO of Apple
- Board member of: Goldman Sachs
- Spouse: Mary Beth

Peter Oppenheimer (born January 14, 1963) is the former senior vice president and Chief Financial Officer of Apple Inc. and has been a member of the board of directors of Goldman Sachs since 2014.

Oppenheimer spent 18 years at Apple, reporting directly to CEO Tim Cook and serving on the company's executive committee. As CFO, Oppenheimer oversaw the controller, treasury, investor relations, tax, information systems, internal audit, facilities, corporate development, and human resources functions. He retired from Apple in 2014.

== Education ==
Oppenheimer attended California Polytechnic State University where he was a member of the Alpha Gamma Rho fraternity. He graduated with a BA in Agricultural Business in 1985, later receiving an MBA from Santa Clara University, both with honors.

In 2015, Oppenheimer and his wife, Mary Beth, made a $20 million cash donation to Cal Poly, the university's largest to date.

== Career ==
Oppenheimer spent six years in the Information Technology Consulting Practice with Coopers and Lybrand (now PricewaterhouseCoopers) where he managed financial, systems engagements for clients in the insurance, telecommunications, transportation and banking industries. Oppenheimer then joined Automatic Data Processing (ADP), where he was Chief Financial Officer of the Claims Services Division.

In 1996, Oppenheimer joined Apple as controller for the Americas. In 1997, he was promoted to vice president and Worldwide Sales controller and then to corporate controller.

On March 3, 2014, Oppenheimer was appointed an independent director of The Goldman Sachs Group, Inc., joining the firm's Audit, Risk, Compensation, and Corporate Governance/Nominating & Public Responsibilities committees.

In March 2014, Oppenheimer retired from Apple and was replaced by Luca Maestri.

== Recognition ==
Oppenheimer received the Bay Area CFO of the Year Awards' Hall of Fame - Lifetime Achievement Award in 2016.

== Personal life ==
Oppenheimer is married to Mary Beth Oppenheimer. Their philanthropy to Cal Poly has supported new facilities and student initiatives.
