= Kevan Parekh =

American business executive (born 1972)

- Born: 1972 (age 53–54)
- Education: University of Michigan (B.S.); University of Chicago (MBA)
- Occupation: executive
- Title: CFO, Apple Inc.
- Board member of: Apple

Kevan Parekh (born 1972) is an American business executive who has been the chief financial officer of Apple Inc. since January 2025. Prior to this, he worked in other positions at Apple for eleven years, including as vice president of Financial Planning and Analysis. Parekh had previously worked at Thomson Reuters and General Motors.

== Early life and education ==
Parekh is from an Indian American family. He attended the University of Michigan, where he received a bachelor's degree in electrical engineering. He later received his Master of Business Administration (MBA) from the University of Chicago Booth School of Business.

== Career ==
Before Apple, Parekh worked at Thomson Reuters for over four years and at General Motors for over five years.

Parekh joined Apple in 2013. Prior to serving as chief financial officer, he was the vice president of Financial Planning and Analysis and spent time as the head of Worldwide Sales, Retail, and Marketing Finance at Apple. He started his Apple career as the head of financial support of some of Apple's business divisions.

He replaced Luca Maestri as the chief financial officer of Apple on 1 January 2025. As part of this role, Parekh joined Apple's executive team, reporting directly to CEO John Ternus. As chief financial officer, Parekh leads Apple's finance and corporate services teams and oversees accounting, business support, financial planning and analysis, treasury, investor relations, internal audit, tax, corporate development, information systems and technology, information security, and real estate and development. In this role, he will receive a base salary of $1 million.
