= Alan Dye =

American designer

- Born: Buffalo, New York, United States
- Education: Syracuse University
- Occupation: Designer
- Employer(s): Meta, Apple
- Known for: Created the Liquid Glass user interface for Apple

Alan Dye is an American designer who works at Meta and formerly worked as a design chief for Apple. He created the Liquid Glass user interface for Apple devices and played roles in shaping other devices including the iPhone X, Apple Watch and Vision Pro. In late 2025, he left Apple to become Chief Design Officer at Meta.

== Early life ==
Dye was born in Buffalo, New York, United States.

He was educated at Syracuse University and graduated in 1997.

== Career ==
Dye first worked at Ogilvy and Mather's Brand Integration Group and then he worked for retailer Kate Spade. He was also a freelance artist for book publishers and other publications.

Dye joined Apple in 2006 and was involved with the design of packaging and the unboxing experience. Dye also contributed to the design language of iOS 7 in 2013. In 2015, Dye became the head of Apple's Human Interface design team. In 2022, he contributed in the creation of the Dynamic Island, a feature on iPhones and then in 2025, he led the design of Liquid Glass. He was also involved in the creation of the iPhone X, Vision Pro, and Apple Watch. He was succeeded by Stephen Lemay at Apple.

Dye resigned from Apple on December 5, 2025, to become Chief Design Officer for Meta Reality Labs.

Business positions
Preceded by Jony Ive	Human interface design lead at Apple; 2015–2025	Succeeded by Stephen Lemay
