= GoMentum Station =

Connected- and autonomous-vehicle testing ground

Coordinates: 38°00′53″N 122°00′31″W

GoMentum Station is a testing ground for connected and autonomous vehicles at the former Concord Naval Weapons Station (CNWS) in Concord, California, United States. The property was acquired and repurposed by the Contra Costa Transportation Authority.

In October 2014, the Contra Costa Transportation Authority announced that the GoMentum Station proving grounds would be used to test self-driving cars; according to them, "The public will not have access to the test site, and the self-driving cars will be restricted to the test bed site. With 2,100 acres (850 ha) of testing area and 19.6 miles (31.5 km) of paved roadway, the CNWS is currently the largest secure test bed site in the United States". Mercedes-Benz is reported to have licenses to test new driving technology, including smart infrastructure such as traffic signals that communicate with cars. Among the site's other notable features: "a 7-mile (11 km)-long roadway is great for testing high-speed driving, and a pair of 1,400-foot (430 m)-long tunnels" for sensor testing.

Among the roughly 30 partners listed on the company's site are automakers Toyota and Honda, ridesharing companies Uber and Lyft and China-based autonomous driving company Baidu. In summer 2015, reports suggested the Apple electric car project was interested in using the site, as members of Apple's Special Project group were reported to have met GoMentum representatives but there were no subsequent reports of Apple personnel and vehicles actually using the site.

In August 2019, GoMentum announced the October launch of its V2X (vehicles-to-everything) testing facility.
