= Alex Hitzinger =

German engineer (born 1971)

Alexander Hitzinger
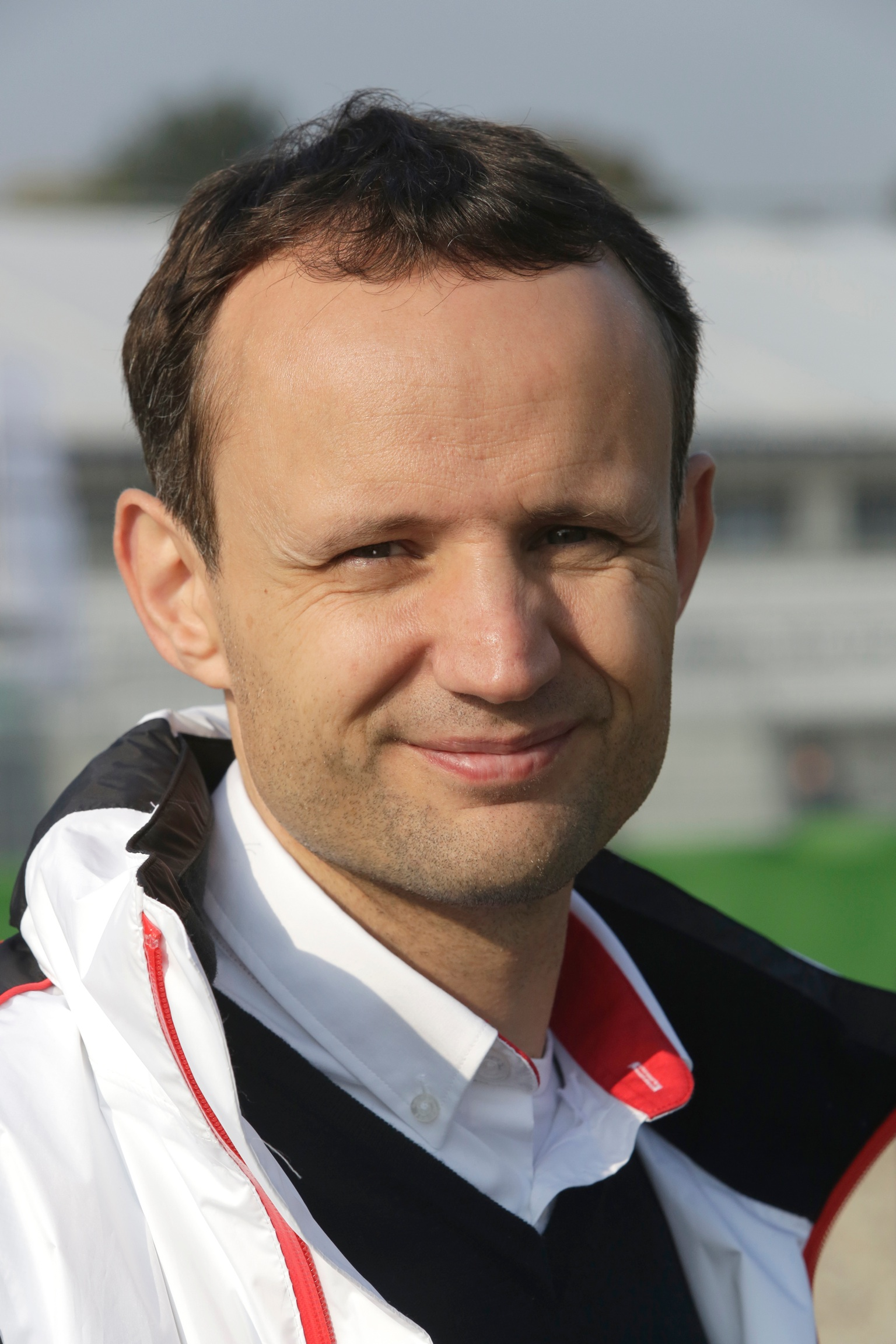
- Born: Alexander Hitzinger; 23 October 1971 (age 54); Passau, West Germany
- Spouse: Madeline

Alexander Hitzinger (born 23 October 1971 in Passau) is a German engineer who until May 2021 was CEO of ARTEMIS GmbH, a start-up in the automotive industry. Before this, he was SVP Autonomous Driving VW Group and Member of the Executive Board VWN, responsible for R&D. He previously also worked as Head of Product Design for Apple's Titan electric vehicle project and Technical Director of the Porsche LMP1 project, Head of Advanced Technologies for the Red Bull and Toro Rosso Formula One teams as well as Head of Formula One development at Cosworth.

== Early life and education ==
Hitzinger was born in Passau, Germany. He has been interested in motorsports since he was a teenager. He studied mechanical engineering at University of Applied Sciences Landshut as an undergraduate and earned an MBA from Warwick Business School at University of Warwick, UK.

== Career ==
Hitzinger's first job in the automotive industry was at Toyota Motorsport as a development engineer. Hitzinger moved to Cosworth together with World Rally Champion Carlos Sainz, when Sainz changed team from Toyota to Ford. At Cosworth, he firstly worked as Head of the Ford-Cosworth World Rally Championship programme and then as Head of F1 Development. In 2005, at the age of 34, Hitzinger was one of the youngest chief engineers in F1.

Under Hitzinger's leadership, in 2006, Cosworth F1 team developed the first ever F1 engine (Cosworth CA, 2.4 Litre, V8) to attain 20,000 rpm at the track, despite the difficult circumstances (underfunded and small number of staff). This set a new standard at the time for F1 engines.

From 2006 to 2011 he worked as Head of Advanced Technologies for Red Bull Technology and from mid-2006 to mid-2007 he also filled the role of Technical Director of the Scuderia Toro Rosso Formula One team.

Since 2011, Hitzinger has been Technical Director of the Porsche LMP1 project. Acknowledging his achievements so far he was awarded the Automotive News Europe Rising Star in 2014. After winning the 24 Hours of Le Mans with Porsche 919 in 2015 he left Porsche in March 2016 in order to move to Apple. Hitzinger served at Apple's Titan electric car project as Head of Product Design in the Special Projects Group.

In January 2019 he started working for Volkswagen as Member of the management board responsible for technical development for its commercial vehicles division as well as Senior Vice President of its self-driving car and MaaS (mobility-as-a-service) programs. Hitzinger's "ability to conceptualise clean-sheet designs and manage projects" led to his appointment as CEO of ARTEMIS GmbH, a 100% subsidiary of the Volkswagen Group, in November 2020. He stepped down from this position in May 2021.
