= Sina Tamaddon =

Apple's former senior vice president of applications

- Born: 1957 (age 68–69); Tabriz, Iran
- Education: Purdue University

Sina Tamaddon (Persian: سینا تمدن, Persian pronunciation: [siːˌnɒː tæmædˈdon]) was senior vice president of applications for Apple Inc. until October 2009.

Sina Tamaddon joined Apple in September 1997. He also served the company in the position of senior vice president of worldwide service and support, and vice president and general manager of the Newton group. Before joining Apple, Tamaddon was vice president of Europe with NeXT from September 1996 through March 1997. From August 1994 to August 1996, Tamaddon was vice president of professional services with NeXT.

Prior to August 1994 Tamaddon worked for Software Alliance w Todd Rulon-Miller. Prior to joining Software Alliance, Tamaddon worked for NeXT as the sales manager for their Chicago office. Prior to NeXT, Tamaddon worked for Sun Microsystems.

== See also ==
- Outline of Apple Inc. (personnel)
- History of Apple Inc.
