= Stephen Lemay =

American designer

- Occupations: Software designer, UI designer
- Years active: 1999–present
- Employer: Apple Inc.
- Known for: User interface design at Apple

Stephen Lemay is an American software and user interface designer best known for his long-standing role at Apple Inc.. He has been a member of Apple's design organization since 1999 and was appointed Head of User Interface Design in 2025. Lemay is considered one of the key contributors to the evolution of Apple's software interfaces across multiple platforms.

== Career ==
Lemay joined Apple in 1999 and has worked within the company's software design and human interface teams for more than two decades. During this time, he has contributed to the design and refinement of Apple's core operating systems, including macOS, iOS, iPadOS, watchOS, and visionOS.

He has been involved in the development of Apple's system-level interaction models, including touch-based input, text selection, and stylus-related interface behaviors. Media reports and patent records associate Lemay with interaction design work related to Apple Pencil, particularly in areas concerning precision input, handwriting, and system responsiveness.

== Design contributions ==
Lemay has played a role in shaping several major phases of Apple's software design language. He contributed to the maturation of the Aqua user interface introduced in early versions of macOS, helping define its visual depth, motion, and interaction principles.

In later years, he was involved in internal efforts to modernize Apple's interface systems, including work associated with translucent materials, layered surfaces, and glass-like visual effects. Some media outlets and developers have referred to these internal design directions as part of Apple's evolving "Liquid Glass" aesthetic, particularly as seen across recent versions of iOS, macOS, and visionOS.

== Head of User Interface Design ==
In 2025, Lemay was promoted to Head of User Interface Design at Apple following a leadership transition within the company's design organization. His appointment was viewed as a continuation of Apple's existing design philosophy, given his deep institutional knowledge and long involvement with the company's software interfaces.

Colleagues and commentators have described Lemay as a detail-oriented designer with a strong emphasis on usability, consistency, and long-term system thinking across Apple's ecosystem.
