= Sabih Khan =

American business executive

- Born: 1966 (age 59–60); Moradabad, Uttar Pradesh, India
- Education: Tufts University (BS); Rensselaer Polytechnic Institute (MS)
- Occupations: COO, Apple

Sabih Khan (born 1966) is an Indian-born American business executive, who is currently the chief operating officer at Apple Inc. He assumed the role following the retirement of Jeff Williams in July 2025, and was previously the senior vice president of operations overseeing Apple's global supply chain and supplier responsibility programs.

== Early life and education ==
Khan was born in 1966 in Moradabad, in Uttar Pradesh, India. His family moved to Singapore when he was in fifth grade. He earned a bachelor's degree in economics and mechanical engineering from Tufts University in Medford, Massachusetts, and a master's degree in mechanical engineering from Rensselaer Polytechnic Institute in Troy, New York.

== Career ==
=== GE Plastics ===
Khan worked for GE Plastics (now SABIC), where he was an applications development engineer and key account technical leader.

=== Apple ===
Khan joined Apple in 1995.

==== Why are you still here? ====
Several reports that he's the Apple executive that has been "still here" when Tim Cooks figures out he's still in the meeting when supply-chain issues are still ongoing :

Cook’s no-nonsense approach to management and solving problems was made immediately evident upon coming to Apple. When in a meeting discussing a problem in China, Tim Cook noted that the problem was “really bad” and that someone should be in China fixing it. Thirty minutes later, Cook then famously looked over at Apple’s operations manager, Sabih Khan, and asked “Why are you still here?” Khan was on the next flight to China. — Who Is Apple’s New CEO Tim Cook? [Bio] - Cult of Mac

==== Executive positions ====
On June 27, 2019, Khan was named senior vice president of operations, reporting to Jeff Williams. In his role at Apple, Khan's operations department has been responsible for establishing partnerships with green manufacturing suppliers. Additionally, Khan's department was responsible for changes to suppliers' operations in response to the COVID-19 pandemic.

On July 8, 2025, Apple announced that Khan would succeed Williams as Chief Operating Officer.
