= John Browett =

British businessman (born 1963)

- Born: 10 December 1963 (age 62); Rutland, England
- Education: University of Cambridge; University of Pennsylvania

John Browett (born 10 December 1963) is a British businessman and former chief executive of Dunelm Group and Monsoon Accessorize. He was the senior vice-president of retail at Apple Inc. from April 2012 to October 2012.

== Early life ==
Browett was born in Rutland in 1963. He attended Uppingham Community College, a comprehensive school in Uppingham, then Rutland Sixth Form College in Oakham. He studied Zoology at Magdalene College, Cambridge, worked briefly for Kleinwort Benson, and then did an MBA at the Wharton School of the University of Pennsylvania in the United States.

== Career ==
From 1993 to 1998, Browett worked for the Boston Consulting Group, and then moved to Tesco, where from 1999 to 2004 he was chief executive of Tesco.com. In October 2007, Browett was hired as a non-executive director of the EasyJet board. In December 2007, he was appointed group chief executive of electronics retailer Dixons, where he helped to improve the company's poor reputation for customer service, serving until February 2012.

In April 2012, Browett took over from Ron Johnson as senior vice-president of retail at Apple in Cupertino, California. In October, Apple announced that Browett was leaving the company, and that a new head of retail was being sought. In May 2019, Bloomberg attributed his departure to his "morale-damaging" efforts following employee firings, cut hours, fewer promotions and a reduction in overtime for staff operating within Apple Stores that led to Tim Cook firing him.

In March 2013, Browett was appointed chief executive of Monsoon Accessorize. In his first year in charge the company returned to profitability, with pre-tax profits of £18.1 million in the financial year to 31 August 2013, compared to a pre-tax loss of £2.4 million in the previous year.

He left Monsoon in February 2015, and became chief executive designate of the Dunelm Group from July of that year, expected to take over the position from January 2016. In July 2015, he joined Octopus Group board as a non-executive director.

By the end of August 2017, Browett had left Dunelm where he was seen, as with Apple, as a bad fit for the culture of the company. Since 2018, he has been at BillSave UK.

In 2023, he was appointed as a new Chairman of the UK fibre network operator Vorboss, also entering the board of Fern Trading Group.

== See also ==
- Outline of Apple Inc. (personnel)
- History of Apple Inc.
