= Eddy Cue =

Senior vice president at Apple, Inc. (born 1964)

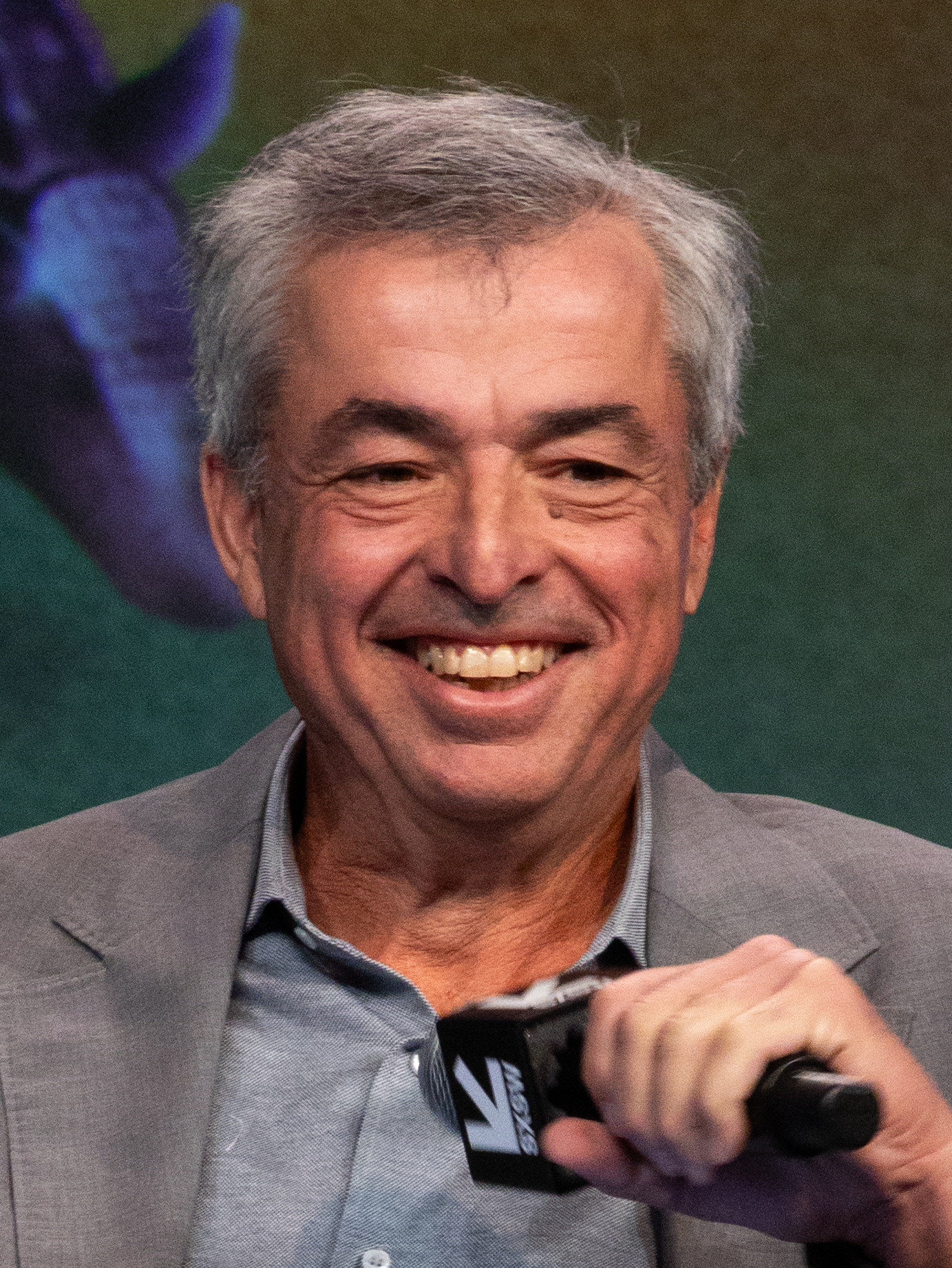
- Cue in 2025
- Born: Eduardo H. Cue; October 23, 1964 (age 62); Miami, Florida, US
- Education: Duke University
- Occupations: Senior Vice President; Services
- Employer: Apple Inc.
- Board member of: Ferrari N.V., FanSnap
- Spouse: Paula Cue
- Website: apple.com/leadership/eddy-cue

Eduardo H. Cue (born October 23, 1964) is Apple's senior vice president of services, reporting to CEO John Ternus. Cue oversees Apple's numerous content stores and products including the iTunes Store, the Apple Books Store, Apple Music, Apple TV, Apple Pay, Siri (until 2017), Apple Maps, iAd, iCloud services, and Apple's productivity and creativity apps. Cue testified in the antitrust case against Apple for conspiring on eBook pricing.

== Business career ==
=== Early career (1990s) ===
Eddy Cue joined Apple in 1989 and was instrumental in creating the Apple online store in 1997, the iTunes Store in 2003, and the App Store in 2008. In his early years at Apple, he was a manager of software engineering and customer support teams. In 1999, he convinced Apple to work with Akamai Technologies Inc. on new streaming functions for its QuickTime video software. He also played a key role in developing Apple's iLife suite of applications, namely Apple Books, iAd advertising service, and Apple's App Store of more than 700,000 applications. Cue is widely known at Apple for turning around its failed products, such as the MobileMe data syncing service as well as iCloud in 2011, which now has more than 250 million users. Likewise, Cue is famous for advising Steve Jobs to consider creating a smaller version of the iPad based on his own experience with the product. While Jobs was originally against the idea, Tim Cook eventually agreed with the concept upon becoming CEO after Jobs' death.

=== Today (2011–present) ===
As senior vice president of Services (previously the senior vice president of Internet Software and Services), Cue has addressed Apple's mobile maps, iCloud, and iMessage outages. Additionally, Cue took command of Apple's voice-activated assistant Siri. However, this service was delegated to Craig Federighi, Apple's senior software engineering vice president, and John Giannandrea, Apple's senior vice president of AI/ML. Cue's responsibilities as the leader of iTunes have included attending to the rise of streaming services, leading Apple's competition with Spotify and the acquisition of Shazam. In response to the rise of video streaming services such as Netflix, Amazon, and HBO, Cue has led Apple's new effort to create its own original content. In 2017, it was announced that Apple had set aside nearly $1 billion to produce original video content to compete with HBO, Amazon, and Netflix. With a base salary of $1 million, bonuses and incentives totaling $1.79 million, and $20,000,083 in stock, Cue earned over $22.8 million in total compensation for his leadership and performance during the 2016 fiscal year.

In April 2021, it was revealed that Cue had initially pushed to bring iMessage to Android in 2013 but was overruled by other executives.

== Personal life ==
The son of a Cuban mother and a Spanish father, Cue resides with his wife Paula (whom he met at Duke University) in Los Altos, California, and tries hard to maintain a low profile. Cue is a fan of rock music, with Bruce Springsteen as one of his favorite artists. Cue was recognized by the cancer research center City of Hope with its 2014 Spirit of Life Award, honoring an individual whose work has fundamentally impacted the music, film, and entertainment industry. Cue is also an avid car collector. Most notable in his collection is his one of five Pagani Zonda Cinque Roadster finished in red. It is the only red cinque to exist.

=== Duke University ===
Cue earned bachelor's degrees in computer science and economics at Duke University. Cue is an avid Duke basketball fan, and both of his sons Adam and Spencer studied computer science at Duke University as well. Cue's recent involvement with Duke has included encouraging undergraduate women to study computer science and electrical engineering as part of the Duke Technology (DTech) Scholar program launched in 2016. Additionally, Cue joined Duke Men's Basketball Coach Mike Krzyzewski in founding PowerForward, a mobile video network which targets the business-to-business (B2B) market offering subscriptions to video content and case studies aimed to help corporations foster leadership and build teams. He is also the first Cuban-American on Duke's Board of Trustees and donated $10 million to the Duke Science and Technology Initiative in 2021.

== See also ==
- Angela Ahrendts
- Jony Ive
- Craig Federighi
- Dan Riccio
- John Ternus
