= Apple Developer =

Apple's developer network

- Website type: Software development website
- Owner: Apple
- Website: developer.apple.com
- Registration: Optional
- Current status: Active

Apple Developer (formerly Apple Developer Connection) is Apple's website for software development tools, application programming interfaces (APIs), and technical resources. It contains resources to help software developers write software for the macOS, iOS, iPadOS, watchOS, tvOS and visionOS platforms. The site also hosts the Apple Developer Forums.

The applications are created in Xcode, or sometimes using other supported 3rd party programs. The apps can then be submitted to App Store Connect (formerly iTunes Connect) for review. Once approved, they can be distributed publicly via the respective app stores, i.e. App Store (iOS) for iOS and iPadOS apps, iMessage app store for Messages apps and Sticker pack apps, App Store (tvOS) for Apple TV apps, watchOS app store for Apple Watch apps with watchOS 6 and later, and via App Store (iOS) for earlier versions of watchOS. macOS apps are a notable exception to this, as they can be distributed similarly via Apple's Mac App Store or independently on the World Wide Web.

== Programs ==
=== Mac ===
The Mac developer program is a way for developers of Apple's macOS operating system to distribute their apps through the Mac App Store. It costs US$99/year. Unlike iOS, developers are not required to sign up for the program in order to distribute their applications. Mac applications can freely be distributed via the developer's website and/or any other method of distribution excluding the Mac App Store. The Mac Developer Program also provides developers with resources to help them distribute their Mac applications.

== Software leaks ==
There have been several leaks of secret Apple software through the prerelease program, most notably the Mac OS X 10.4 Tiger leaks, in which Apple sued three men who allegedly obtained advance copies of Mac OS X 10.4 prerelease builds from the site and leaked them via BitTorrent.

== Attempted hacks ==
On July 18, 2013, an intruder attempted to access sensitive personal information on Apple's developer servers. The information was encrypted, but Apple could not guarantee that some information about developers may have been accessed. The Developer website was taken down for "maintenance" that Thursday, and was said to be undergoing maintenance through Sunday, when Apple posted a notice on the site notifying users of the attempted hack. They have stated that they will be rebuilding their servers and the developer system to prevent this from happening in the future.

== Developer tutorials and tools ==
Apple provides free tutorials and guide support for their developer program.

In the beginning of July 2023, Apple finished construction on their Developer Center in Cupertino, California. During special events, developers are able to visit the center for one-on-one’s with Apple employees, demos of upcoming software, and more.

== Apple Security Research Device Program ==
The Security Research Device (SRD) is a specially fused iPhone that allows users to perform iOS security research without having to bypass its security features. Even though shell access is available, users can run any tools, choose their own entitlements, and customize the kernel. With the SRD, users can confidently report all their findings to Apple without the risk of losing access to the inner layers of iOS security. Any vulnerabilities users discover with the SRD are automatically considered for Apple Security Bounty.

The SRD program is available in many countries, such as Argentina, Armenia, Australia, Austria, Azerbaijan, Belgium, Bosnia and Herzegovina, Brazil, Bulgaria, Canada, Croatia, the Czech Republic, Denmark, Estonia, Finland, France, Georgia, Germany, Greece, Hungary, Iceland, India, Ireland, Italy, Japan, Latvia, Liechtenstein, Lithuania, Luxembourg, Moldova, Montenegro, Morocco, the Netherlands, New Zealand, North Macedonia, Norway, Poland, Portugal, Romania, Senegal, Serbia, Singapore, Slovakia, Slovenia, South Africa, South Korea, Spain, Sweden, Switzerland, the United Kingdom and the United States.

== See also ==
- Apple Account
