= Tesco.com =

Website of British retailer Tesco

- Frontpage, 13 February 2025
- Website type: Online retailer
- Available in: English
- Owner: Tesco
- Website: www.tesco.com
- Commercial: Yes
- Launched: 2000
- Current status: Active

Tesco.com is an electronic commerce website operated by Tesco. It offers a wide range of other products, including electronic goods, books, broadband and financial services. Tesco closed their Tesco Direct website in 2018.

== History ==
Tesco has operated on the Internet and started an online shopping service named 'Tesco Direct' in 1997. Concerned with poor web response times (in 1996, broadband was virtually unknown in the United Kingdom), Tesco offered a CDROM-based off-line ordering program which would connect only to download stock lists and send orders. This was in addition to, rather than instead of, ordering via web forms, but was withdrawn in 2000. Tesco.com was formally launched on 11 April 2000. It also has online operations in the Republic of Ireland and South Korea. In 2003, tesco.com's CEO at the time, John Browett, received the Wharton Infosys Business Transformation Award for the innovative processes he used to support this online grocery service.

In 2001, Tesco.com invested in GroceryWorks, a joint venture with the American Safeway Inc. (who had long since sold-off their UK subsidiary and Tesco's former rival, Safeway plc), operating in the United States and Canada. GroceryWorks had stepped into the void left by the collapse of Webvan, but did not expand as fast as initially expected and Tesco sold its stake to Safeway Inc in 2006.

Tesco claimed in its 2005 annual report to be able to serve 98% of the UK population from its 300 participating supermarkets. In the financial year ended 24 February 2007, it recorded online sales up 29.2% to £1.2 billion and profit up 48.5% to £83 million, with over 250,000 orders per week.

Tesco launched its first home shopping catalogue in autumn 2006, as another channel for sales of its non-food ranges. This is integrated with the internet operation, with both channels being branded as "Tesco Direct".

Tesco launched an advertising campaign for its internet phone, marketing the service to customers by offering free calls to all other Tesco internet phone customers.

On 1 October 2006, Tesco announced it would be selling six own-brand budget software packages for under £20 each, including office and security suites, in a partnership with software firm Formjet. As Formjet is exclusive distributor for Panda Security and Ability Plus Software, packages from these companies are likely to feature.

In June 2007, Tesco.com became the first home delivery company in UK to provide customers the option of delivering shopping in green boxes without carrier bags in a bid to reduce the amount of carrier bags used as part of Tesco's green commitment. In return for customers going bag free they receive green clubcard points. After trialling a fully bagless delivery service, Tesco stopped using plastic and paper carrier bags for all online orders delivered from 19 August 2019. The only bags used from this date will be for small loose items such as nuts and small fruits which could not be placed loose in a delivery crate, and small bags for meat/fish items which might otherwise prove a hygiene risk.

In July 2009, Tesco became the first supermarket in the world to offer an API. This feature will potentially pave the way for smart appliances such as networked fridges that can automatically order food.

Tesco.com acts as a portal website to its other major on-line business areas: Tesco Grocery, Tesco direct, Clubcard, Bank, Clothing, Wine By The Case, and Tesco Entertainment.

In the 2020s it launched Tesco Whoosh, a same day delivery service that operates out of local Tesco Express stores. It has a minimum basket size of £15 and a flat delivery charge of £2.99 per delivery. The deliveries are outsourced to various food delivery apps. It has been heavily marketed around events such as the World Cup and other sporting events.

== See also ==
- Bricks and clicks
- Electronic business
