= Bob Mansfield =

American engineer

- Known for: Senior leadership at Apple Inc.

Bob Mansfield is an American hardware engineer. He was formerly senior vice president of technologies at Apple, Inc., before leaving that role to focus on unnamed future products. It has been claimed that he supervised the development of the Apple Watch or smart television products.

== Education ==
Mansfield earned a BSEE degree from the University of Texas in 1982.

== Career ==
Early in his career, he had the positions of senior director at SGI and vice president of engineering at Raycer Graphics, subsequently acquired by Apple in 1999. Following the acquisition, Mansfield stayed on with Apple to fill his new role of senior vice president of Mac hardware engineering, overseeing teams that delivered products such as the iMac, MacBook, MacBook Air and iPad.

In August 2010, Mansfield took over the position of devices hardware engineering from the departed Mark Papermaster. Although Apple announced Bob Mansfield's retirement on June 28, 2012, it was announced on August 27, 2012 that Mansfield would remain at Apple, working on "future projects" and reporting to Tim Cook.

Apple announced on October 29, 2012 that Mansfield would take on a new role at Apple as senior vice president of technologies. Reports have claimed that Scott Forstall's departure was a key reason for Mansfield's unexpected return from retirement. On July 28, 2013, roughly 9 months after Mansfield's appointment to senior vice president of technologies, Mansfield's biography was removed from Apple's executive profiles webpage. It was subsequently confirmed by Apple that Mansfield was no longer a part of the executive team, but would "continue to work on special projects under CEO Tim Cook."

He was heading Apple's car project until 2020. Following Mansfield's departure, Apple's AI executive John Giannandrea led the project, which was ultimately cancelled in 2024.
