= Luca Maestri =

Italian-American business executive

- Born: 14 October 1963 (age 62); Rome, Italy
- Education: Luiss University (BEc); Boston University (MS)
- Occupation: Business executive
- Known for: Former chief financial officer of Apple, Inc.
- Board member of: Apple, Inc.

Luca Maestri (born 14 October 1963) is an Italian-born American business executive. He was the chief financial officer (CFO) of Apple Inc from 2014 until the end of 2024. Since 2025, he has led the corporate services teams at Apple.

== Education ==
Maestri has a bachelor's degree in economics from Luiss University in Rome, Italy, in 1987 and a master's degree in management from Boston University in 1991.

== Career ==
=== Before Apple ===
The first global company where Maestri worked was at General Motors. After that, in 2009, he worked at Nokia Networks and at Xerox as a CFO.

=== Apple ===
In 2014, after working at Apple Inc. as vice president of finance and corporate controller, he was appointed the position of chief financial officer. Along with being the chief financial officer, he assumed the responsibility of principal accounting officer. Upon being appointed chief financial officer, he was issued 6,337 restricted stock units (currently worth approximately $4 million). Maestri's official salary is $1 million but he is eligible for Apple's performance-based cash bonus program which increases his salary. In 2014, he took in a salary of $14 million and in 2015, he took in a salary of $25.3 million. Based on SEC filings, from 2018 to 2020, Maestri's average compensation was $26 million.

Maestri stepped down as chief financial officer at the end of 2024. After relinquishing the role to Kevan Parekh, Maestri heads the corporate services teams, reporting to Apple chief executive Tim Cook.
