= ITunes Connect =

Apple media distribution platform

iTunes Connect
- Developer: Apple
- Status: Active
- Website: itunesconnect.apple.com

iTunes Connect is an Apple service that producers can use to distribute music, podcasts, movies, and TV programmes to customers on the iTunes Store and ebooks to customers on the Apple Books Store.

== App Store Connect ==
App Store Connect
- Developer: Apple
- Launched: June 2018
- Status: Active
- Website: appstoreconnect.apple.com

In June 2018, Apple launched a dedicated service, App Store Connect, for registered developers to publish apps on the App Store and Mac App Store. Previously, developers could use iTunes Connect to publish apps to the App Store.

Publishing apps in App Store Connect requires a paid Apple Developer program membership. The yearly fee amounts to $99 or the equivalent in the developer's local currency.

== Features ==
Both iTunes Connect and App Store Connect let users add metadata to items, define which countries items are available in, view sales reports, and collaborate on the same projects by adding team members.
