= John Ternus =

American engineer and business executive (born 1975)

- Ternus in 2026
- Born: John Patrick Ternus; May 1975 (age 51); California, U.S.
- Education: University of Pennsylvania (BSE)
- Title: CEO of Apple (2026–present); Senior Vice President of Hardware Engineering of Apple (2021–2026); Vice President of Hardware Engineering of Apple (2013–2021)
- Predecessor: Tim Cook

John Patrick Ternus (/ˈtɜːrnəs/; born May 1975) is an American engineer and business executive who has been the chief executive officer (CEO) of Apple since September 1, 2026. Ternus joined Apple's product design team in 2001, and was the company's senior vice president of hardware engineering from 2021 to 2026.

Apple has credited Ternus with work on the iPad and AirPods product lines, and he oversaw hardware engineering during the company's transition from Intel processors to Apple silicon in Mac computers. Upon inheriting Dan Riccio's position as senior vice president of hardware engineering, it had been widely reported by tech analysts that he had radically changed Apple's hardware and design philosophy, pivoting Apple's hardware engineering into prioritising function over form, marking a major departure from Jony Ive's form over function focus for Apple products.

== Early life and education ==
John Patrick Ternus was born in May 1975 in California, United States. He received a bachelor's degree in mechanical engineering from the University of Pennsylvania in 1997, and was on the men's swimming team. For his senior project, he developed a mechanical feeding arm operable by individuals with quadriplegia using head movements.

== Career ==
Ternus began his career as a mechanical engineer designing virtual reality headsets at Virtual Research Systems. He joined Apple in 2001 as a member of the product design team, working first on the Apple Cinema Display. He arrived during a pivotal era for the company shortly after Steve Jobs returned and the iMac kept revitalising the brand. In 2013, he was appointed vice president of hardware engineering under Dan Riccio, overseeing the development of the AirPods, Mac and iPad product lines.

In 2020, he was also put in charge of iPhone hardware, previously overseen directly by Riccio. He was also in charge of overseeing the transition from Intel processors to Apple silicon in Mac computers that started the same year. He was promoted to senior vice president of hardware engineering in 2021, replacing Riccio, and was put in charge of Apple Watch hardware in late 2022. Bloomberg News reported that Ternus was then the "youngest member of Apple's executive team", and described him as "charismatic and well-liked".

In January 2026, Ternus was given oversight of Apple's industrial design team, a change that Bloomberg News described as a further indication of his candidacy for the chief executive role.

During his tenure as senior vice president, Ternus was widely reported to be a potential successor to Tim Cook as the company's CEO. His appointment was announced on April 20, 2026, and took effect on September 1, when he also joined Apple's board and Cook became executive chair.

== Personal life ==
Ternus is a cycling and car racing enthusiast, and has taken colleagues to Washington state for off-road rally car racing. His hobbies include racing his Porsche at tracks such as California's Laguna Seca raceway. He is married, with children.

Business positions
Preceded by Tim Cook	CEO of Apple; 2026–present	Incumbent
