= Dan Riccio =

Former Apple senior vice president of hardware engineering

- Born: Daniel J. Riccio
- Education: University of Massachusetts Amherst (B.S.); Mechanical Engineering
- Occupations: Retired vice president and director at Apple Inc.

Daniel J. Riccio is an American engineer and former executive. He was Apple's senior vice president of hardware engineering, reporting to CEO Tim Cook, until 2021. Riccio led the Mac, iPhone, iPad, iPod, Apple TV, HomePod, AirPods, and Apple Watch engineering teams. He was succeeded by John Ternus on January 25, 2021. He retired from Apple in October 2024.

== Biography ==
Riccio holds a bachelor's degree in mechanical engineering and a master's degree in manufacturing engineering from the University of Massachusetts Amherst.

Before Apple, Riccio worked at Compaq as senior manager of mechanical engineering, responsible for the mechanical design of consumer PC products.

He joined Apple in 1998 as vice president of product design and in 2010 was named vice president of iPad hardware engineering. On January 26, 2021, Apple announced that Riccio would transition to a new role reporting to CEO Tim Cook.

On January 25, 2021, he was succeeded by John Ternus as SVP of hardware engineering, and transitioned to an unnamed role at Apple working on a new project, rumored to be an augmented reality and virtual reality headset, later becoming the Apple Vision Pro.

On September 15, 2025, Riccio announced a $50 million gift to the University of Massachusetts Amherst, resulting in the renaming of their engineering college the Daniel J. Riccio Jr. College of Engineering.

== See also ==
List of mechanical engineers
