= Craig Federighi =

American software engineer (born 1968 or 1969)

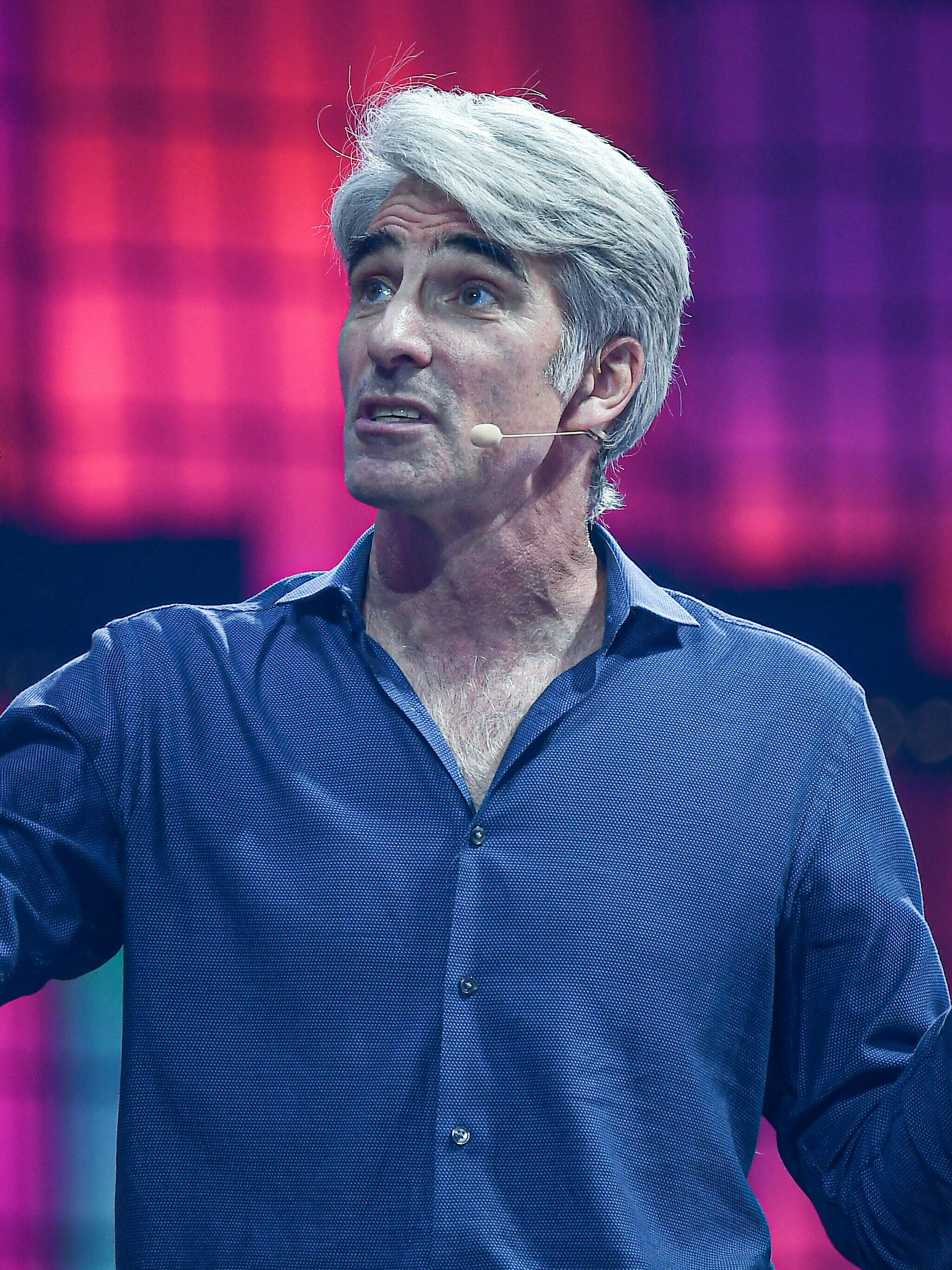
- Federighi in 2021
- Born: 1968 or 1969 (age 57–58); San Leandro, California, U.S.
- Education: University of California, Berkeley (BS, MS)
- Occupation: Senior vice-president of software engineering at Apple Inc.
- Known for: Part of Apple Inc. leadership
- Children: 4
- Website: https://www.apple.com/leadership/craig-federighi/

Craig Federighi (born 1968 or 1969) is an American engineer and business executive who has been the senior vice president (SVP) of software engineering at Apple Inc. since 2012. He oversees the development of Apple's operating systems and core artificial intelligence (AI) efforts. His teams are responsible for delivering the software of Apple's products, including the user interface, applications, and frameworks.

== Early life and education ==
Federighi was born in San Leandro, California. He received a bachelor of science in electrical engineering and computer science and a master of science in computer science from the University of California, Berkeley, in 1991 and 1993, respectively.

== Career ==
=== NeXT and Ariba ===
Federighi worked at NeXT, where he led development of the Enterprise Objects Framework. He joined Apple when it acquired NeXT in 1996, but then left it in 1999 for Ariba, where he held several roles including chief technology officer.

=== Return to Apple ===
Federighi returned to Apple in 2009 to lead macOS engineering, after Apple had just finished developing Mac OS X Snow Leopard, which was highly regarded for its focus on speed and quality. In March 2011, Federighi succeeded Bertrand Serlet as vice president of Mac software engineering at Apple, and in August 2012 he was promoted to senior vice president, reporting to CEO Tim Cook. Upon Scott Forstall's departure from Apple, his role was expanded to encompass iOS in addition to macOS. As of 2026, his role encompasses all of Apple's operating systems (iOS, iPadOS, watchOS, tvOS, visionOS) and core AI efforts (Siri & Apple Intelligence). In the following decade of Federighi's leadership, some observers noted an increase in defects and bugs within Apple's software products.

In March 2016, Federighi wrote an article for The Washington Post stating that "I became an engineer because I believe in the power of technology to enrich our lives" as his motivation.

Federighi was reported to own more than 500,000 shares of Apple stock worth about US$91.6 million as of June 2025.

== Public image ==
Within the community of Apple users and developers, Federighi is known for his presentations at Apple public events (WWDC or other Apple Special Events). His first appearance onstage during a major Apple event was at WWDC 2009, where he helped Bertrand Serlet introduce Mac OS X Snow Leopard. He made another appearance during 2010's 'Back to the Mac' presentation, showing off Mac OS X Lion. Since 2012 (the year he was promoted to senior vice president), he has made annual appearances at Apple events. As he is in charge of Apple's software engineering, he would often be responsible for making major Apple software announcements there, such as the introductions of major operating system releases, AI or Swift-related news.

Federighi's presentations often feature absurdist humor such as references to his hair, use of new software features to organize events such as office karaoke parties and camping trips, and his claimed love of the band Rush. A running gag in Federighi's macOS presentations involves him describing the fictional exploits of the “crack product marketing team”, venturing naked through California in a Volkswagen Minibus and ultimately arriving at the location after which the version of the operating system is named. Federighi has some notable nicknames around Apple, such as "Hair Force One". Additionally, Cook has called him "Superman".At the November 2020 Apple Special Event, a video of him “setting the mood” by waking a MacBook from sleep instantly became a meme.

At an Apple Special Event in September 2017, Federighi initially failed to properly demo the Face ID feature on the iPhone X. Apple stated that before the event, some Apple employees had inadvertently triggered Face ID on one of the demonstration phones, causing it to instead prompt for a passcode when Federighi attempted to unlock it.

He has also appeared in events outside of Apple. In November 2021, he appeared at the Web Summit talking about the dangers of allowing sideloading in the iOS ecosystem.

== Personal life ==
Federighi is of Italian descent. Federighi met his wife while working at Ariba and they have four daughters together.
