= Lists of schools in England =

Links to regional lists

The schools in England are organised into local education authorities. There are 150 local education authorities in England organised into nine larger regions. According to the Schools Census, there were 3,408 maintained government secondary schools in England in 2017.

BESA, the British Educational Suppliers Association, has more up-to-date figures. It states that in 2019, there are approximately 30,000 schools in England, which include 391 nurseries, around 25,000 primary schools, 3,448 secondary schools, 2,319 independent schools, 1,044 special schools, and 352 pupil referral units. There are 1,170 multi-academy trusts that manage at least two schools: 598 have five or fewer schools, 259 have 6–11 schools, 85 have between 12–25 schools, and 29 MATs have 26 or more schools.

== East of England ==
There are 11 local education authorities in the East of England.

- List of schools in Bedford
- List of schools in Cambridgeshire
- List of schools in Central Bedfordshire
- List of schools in Essex
- List of schools in Hertfordshire
- List of schools in Luton
- List of schools in Norfolk
- List of schools in Peterborough
- List of education establishments in Southend-on-Sea
- List of schools in Suffolk
- List of schools in Thurrock

== South East of England ==
There are 19 local education authorities in the South East of England.

- List of schools in Bracknell Forest
- List of schools in Brighton and Hove
- List of schools in Buckinghamshire
- List of schools in East Sussex
- List of schools in Hampshire
- List of schools on the Isle of Wight
- List of schools in Kent
- List of schools in Medway
- List of schools in Milton Keynes
- List of schools in Oxfordshire
- List of schools in Portsmouth
- List of schools in Reading
- List of schools in Slough
- List of schools in Southampton
- List of schools in Surrey
- List of schools in West Berkshire
- List of schools in West Sussex
- List of schools in Windsor and Maidenhead
- List of schools in Wokingham

== South West of England ==
There are 15 local education authorities in the South West of England.

- List of schools in Bath and North East Somerset
- List of schools in Bournemouth, Christchurch and Poole
- List of schools in Bristol
- List of schools in Cornwall
- List of schools in Devon
- List of schools in Dorset
- List of schools in Gloucestershire
- List of schools on the Isles Of Scilly
- List of schools in North Somerset
- List of schools in Plymouth
- List of schools in Somerset
- List of schools in South Gloucestershire
- List of schools in Swindon
- List of schools in Torbay
- List of schools in Wiltshire

== Yorkshire and Humber ==
There are 15 local education authorities in Yorkshire and Humber.

- List of schools in Barnsley
- List of schools in Bradford
- List of schools in Calderdale
- List of schools in Doncaster
- List of schools in the East Riding of Yorkshire
- List of schools in Hull
- List of schools in Kirklees
- List of schools in Leeds
- List of schools in North East Lincolnshire
- List of schools in North Lincolnshire
- List of schools in North Yorkshire
- List of schools in Rotherham
- List of schools in Sheffield
- List of schools in Wakefield
- List of schools in York

== North East of England ==
There are 12 local education authorities in the North East of England.

- List of schools in Darlington
- List of schools in Durham
- List of schools in Gateshead
- List of schools in Hartlepool
- List of schools in Middlesbrough
- List of schools in Newcastle Upon Tyne
- List of schools in North Tyneside
- List of schools in Northumberland
- List of schools in Redcar and Cleveland
- List of schools in South Tyneside
- List of schools in Stockton-on-Tees
- List of schools in Sunderland

== North West of England ==
There are 24 local education authorities in the North West of England.

- List of schools in Blackburn with Darwen
- List of schools in Blackpool
- List of schools in Bolton
- List of schools in Bury
- List of schools in Cumberland
- List of schools in Cheshire East
- List of schools in Cheshire West and Chester
- List of schools in Halton
- List of schools in Knowsley
- List of schools in Lancashire
- List of schools in Liverpool
- List of schools in Manchester
- List of schools in Oldham
- List of schools in Rochdale
- List of schools in Salford
- List of schools in Sefton
- List of schools in St Helens
- List of schools in Stockport
- List of schools in Tameside
- List of schools in Trafford
- List of schools in Warrington
- List of schools in Westmorland and Furness
- List of schools in Wigan
- List of schools in Wirral

== East Midlands ==
There are 10 local education authorities in the East Midlands.

- List of schools in Derby
- List of schools in Derbyshire
- List of schools in Leicester
- List of schools in Leicestershire
- List of schools in Lincolnshire
- List of schools in North Northamptonshire
- List of schools in Nottingham
- List of schools in Nottinghamshire
- List of schools in Rutland
- List of schools in West Northamptonshire

== Greater London ==
There are 33 local education authorities in the Greater London area.

- List of schools in Barking and Dagenham
- List of schools in Barnet
- List of schools in Bexley
- List of schools in Brent
- List of schools in Bromley
- List of schools in Camden
- List of schools in the City of London
- List of schools in Croydon
- List of schools in Ealing
- List of schools in Enfield
- List of schools in Greenwich
- List of schools in Hackney
- List of schools in Hammersmith and Fulham
- List of schools in Haringey
- List of schools in Harrow
- List of schools in Havering
- List of schools in Hillingdon
- List of schools in Hounslow
- List of schools in Islington
- List of schools in Kensington and Chelsea
- List of schools in Kingston
- List of schools in Lambeth
- List of schools in Lewisham
- List of schools in Merton
- List of schools in Newham
- List of schools in Redbridge
- List of schools in Richmond upon Thames
- List of schools in Southwark
- List of schools in Sutton
- List of schools in Tower Hamlets
- List of schools in Waltham Forest
- List of schools in Wandsworth
- List of schools in Westminster

== West Midlands ==
There are 14 local education authorities in the West Midlands.

- List of schools in Birmingham
- List of schools in Coventry
- List of schools in Dudley
- List of schools in Herefordshire
- List of schools in Sandwell
- List of schools in Shropshire
- List of schools in Solihull
- List of schools in Staffordshire
- List of schools in Stoke-on-Trent
- List of schools in Telford and Wrekin
- List of schools in Walsall
- List of schools in Warwickshire
- List of schools in Wolverhampton
- List of schools in Worcestershire
