= List of schools in the London Borough of Waltham Forest =

This is the list of schools in the London Borough of Waltham Forest, England.

== State-funded schools ==
=== Primary schools ===
- Ainslie Wood Primary School
- Barclay Primary School
- Barn Croft Primary School
- Beaumont
- Buxton School
- Chapel End Infants' School
- Chapel End Junior Academy
- Chase Lane Primary School
- Chingford CE Primary School
- Coppermill Primary School
- Davies Lane Primary School
- Dawlish Primary School
- Downsell Primary School
- Edinburgh Primary School
- Emmanuel Community School
- George Mitchell School
- George Tomlinson Primary School
- Greenleaf Primary School
- Gwyn Jones Primary School
- Handsworth Primary School
- Henry Maynard Primary School
- Hillyfield Primary Academy
- The Jenny Hammond Primary School
- Lime Academy Larkswood
- Longshaw Primary Academy
- Mayville Primary School
- Mission Grove Primary School
- Newport School
- Oakhill Primary School
- Our Lady & St George's RC Primary School
- Parkside Primary School
- Riverley Primary School
- Roger Ascham Primary School
- St Joseph's RC Infant School
- St Joseph's RC Junior School
- St Mary's RC Primary School
- St Mary's CE Primary School
- St Patrick's RC Primary School
- St Saviour's CE Primary School
- Salisbury Manor Primary School
- Selwyn Primary School
- South Grove Primary School
- Stoneydown Park School
- Sybourn Primary School
- Thomas Gamuel Primary School
- Thorpe Hall Primary School
- Walthamstow Primary Academy
- Whitehall Primary School
- Whittingham Primary Academy
- Willow Brook Primary
- The Winns Primary School
- Woodford Green Primary School
- The Woodside Primary Academy
- Yardley Primary School

=== Secondary schools ===
- Buxton School
- Chingford Foundation School
- Connaught School for Girls
- Eden Girls' School
- Frederick Bremer School
- George Mitchell School
- Heathcote School
- Highams Park School
- Holy Family Catholic School
- Kelmscott School
- Lammas School
- Leytonstone School
- Norlington School
- South Chingford Foundation School
- Walthamstow Academy
- Walthamstow School for Girls
- Willowfield School

=== Special and alternative schools ===
- Belmont Park School/Special/Pupil Referral Unit (PRU)
- Burnside Secondary PRU/Special Needs
- Hawkswood Primary PRU
- Hawkswood (Therapeutic)
- Joseph Clarke School
- Lime Academy Hornbeam
- Whitefield Schools

=== Further education ===
- Big Creative Academy
- Leyton Sixth Form College
- Leyton
- Sir George Monoux College
- Waltham Forest College

== Independent schools ==
=== Primary and preparatory schools ===
- Noor Ul Islam Primary School
- Walthamstow Montessori School

=== Senior and all-through schools ===
- Big Creative Independent School
- Forest School
- Lantern of Knowledge Secondary School
- Normanhurst School
