= List of schools in Rutland =

This is a list of schools in Rutland, England.

== State-funded schools ==
=== Primary schools ===
- Brooke Hill Academy, Oakham
- Catmose Primary, Oakham
- Cottesmore Academy, Cottesmore
- Edith Weston Academy, Edith Weston
- Empingham CE Primary School, Empingham
- English Martyrs' RC Primary School, Oakham
- Exton and Greeton CE Primary School, Exton
- Great Casterton CE Primary School, Great Casterton
- Ketton CE Primary School, Ketton
- Langham CE Primary School, Langham
- Leighfield Primary School, Uppingham
- Oakham CE Primary School, Oakham
- Ryhall CE Academy, Ryhall
- St Mary and St John CE Primary School, North Luffenham
- St Nicholas CE Primary School, Cottesmore
- Uppingham CE Primary School, Uppingham
- Whissendine CE Primary School, Whissendine

=== Secondary schools ===
- Casterton College, Great Casterton
- Catmose College, Oakham
- Uppingham Community College, Uppingham

=== Special and alternative schools ===
- The Parks School, Oakham

=== Further education ===
- Harington School
- Rutland County College

== Independent schools ==
=== Primary and preparatory schools ===
- Brooke Priory School, Oakham

=== Senior and all-through schools ===
- Oakham School, Oakham
- Uppingham School, Uppingham

=== Special and alternative schools ===
- The Shires, Stretton
- The Shires, Oakham
- Wilds Lodge School, Empingham
