= List of schools in the Royal Borough of Kingston upon Thames =

This is a list of schools in the Royal Borough of Kingston upon Thames in London, England.

== State-funded schools ==
School Nurseries

- Maple Infants' and Nursery School

=== Primary schools ===
CE indicates Church of England, and RC indicates Roman Catholic.

- Alexandra School
- Burlington Infant School
- Burlington Junior School
- Castle Hill Primary School
- Christ Church CE Primary School
- Christ Church New Malden CE Primary School
- Coombe Hill Infant School
- Coombe Hill Junior School
- Corpus Christi RC School
- Ellingham Primary School
- Fern Hill Primary School
- Grand Avenue Primary School
- Green Lane Primary School
- King Athelstan Primary School
- King's Oak Primary School
- Kingston Community School
- Knollmead Primary School
- Latchmere School
- Lime Tree Primary School
- Lovelace Primary School
- Malden Manor Primary School
- Malden Parochial CE School
- Maple Infants' and Nursery School
- Our Lady Immaculate RC School
- Robin Hood Primary School
- St Agatha's RC Primary School
- St Andrew's and St Mark's CE Junior School
- St John's CE Primary School
- St Joseph's RC Primary School
- St Luke's CE Primary School
- St Mary's CE Primary School
- St Matthew's CE Primary School
- St Paul's CE Primary School, Chessington
- St Paul's CE Primary School, Kingston Hill
- Tolworth Infant School
- Tolworth Junior School

=== Non-selective secondary schools ===
RC indicates Roman Catholic.

- Chessington School
- Coombe Boys' School
- Coombe Girls' School
- Hollyfield School
- Holy Cross School (Girls) (RC)
- The Kingston Academy
- Richard Challoner School (Boys) (RC)
- Southborough High School (Boys)
- Tolworth Girls' School

=== Grammar schools ===
- Tiffin Girls' School
- Tiffin School (Boys)

=== Special and alternative schools ===
- Bedelsford School
- Dysart School
- Malden Oaks School and Tuition Service
- St Philip's School
- The Spring School

=== Further education ===
- Kingston College
- Richmond and Hillcroft Adult Community College

== Independent schools ==
=== Primary and preparatory schools ===
Age range of pupils in brackets. RC indicates Roman Catholic.

- Educare Small School (3-11)
- Holy Cross Preparatory School (RC, girls 4-11)
- Liberty Woodland School (4-11)
- Park Hill School (2-11) (closed 2025)
- Rokeby Preparatory School (boys 4-13) * Kingston
- Shrewsbury House School (boys 7-13)
- Study School (3-11)
- Westbury House School (3-11)

=== Senior and all-through schools ===
Age range of pupils in brackets. RC indicates Roman Catholic.

- Canbury School (11-16)
- Kingston Grammar School (11-19)
- Marymount International School London (RC, girls 11-18)
- Surbiton High School (girls 4-18, boys 4-11)
- Tennis Avenue School (8-16)
