= Bernarda Seitz =

- Born: Florentina Seitz; 19 June 1927; General Acha, Argentina
- Died: 16 June 2014 (aged 86)
- Other names: María Bernarda Seitz; La Hermana Bernarda
- Occupation(s): Nun, writer, chef, presenter

María Bernarda Seitz (born Florentina Seitz; 19 June 1927 – 16 June 2014), better known as La Hermana Bernarda (Sister Bernarda), was an Argentine Roman Catholic nun, writer, chef, and television presenter.

She became a star of culinary television through programs in which she prepared recipes of German origin, and shared her beliefs and impressions about God, the Church, love, and family.

Seitz hosted Dulces Tentaciones (Sweet Temptations) on the Elgourmet.com channel for several years with great success, as well as shows on América TV. She wrote a series of cookbooks, including the 2003 bestseller 100 recetas: cocina y meditación (100 Recipes: Cooking and Meditation).

== Biography ==
Florentina Seitz was born in General Acha, La Pampa Province, on 19 June 1927, the daughter of Volga Germans Enrique and Barbara Seitz. Her childhood was spent between La Pampa and Coronel Suárez, and later in her father's fields in the south of Córdoba Province.

In 1944, at age 16, she entered the Sisters of the Holy Cross Menzingen, where she received the name María Bernarda, in honor of the congregation's founder, Bernarda Heimgartner.

She lived in Germany and Switzerland in 1986 and 1987, to study cooking and reconnect with her family's origins.

She rose to fame in 2000, with the debut of her program Dulces Tentaciones on Elgourmet.com. Rather than shooting on a set, Seitz cooked in the kitchen of the convent where she lived. She taught viewers how to prepare typical German meals in a simple way, maximizing the use of resources. Despite her status as a Catholic nun, in her programs she referred to God in a way unrelated to a specific religion. Her show became a ratings hit and was shown twice a week.

Her 2003 book 100 recetas: cocina y meditación was a major success, selling 200,000 copies.

Some time later, she came to broadcast television, where she hosted her own program on América TV. In 2003, Elgourmet.com brought her back to host Saladas Tentaciones (Savory Temptations), the second edition of Dulces Tentaciones. She made frequent appearances on Mirtha Legrand's program, often cooking dishes for the other guests.

Seitz died from a stroke on 16 June 2014.

== Books ==
- 100 recetas: cocina y meditación [100 Recipes: Cooking and Meditation] (in Spanish). Buenos Aires: Editorial Bonum. 2003. ISBN 9789505076604. OCLC 53382141.
- 100 recetas dulces [100 Sweet Recipes] (in Spanish). Buenos Aires: Editorial Bonum. 2003. ISBN 9789505076734. OCLC 55217212.
- Recetas económicas y algo más [Economical Recipes and Something More] (in Spanish). Mexico: Oceano. 2004. ISBN 9789707770676. OCLC 893997780.
- 100 recetas para compartir en familia [100 Recipes to Share With Family] (in Spanish). Buenos Aires: Editorial Bonum. 2005. ISBN 9789505077526. OCLC 61673850.
- Mis recetas tradicionales: sabores para recordar [My Traditional Recipes: Flavors to Remember] (in Spanish). Buenos Aires: Editorial Bonum. 2007. ISBN 9789505079933. OCLC 644724935.
