= Casterton College =

Coordinates: 52.6731°N 0.5173°W

Casterton College, Rutland
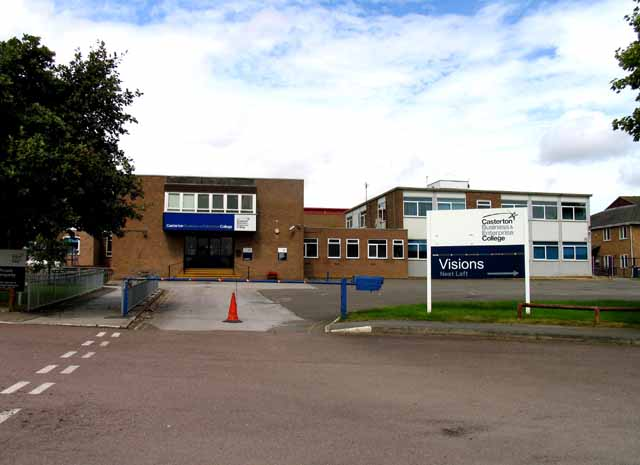
- Casterton Business and Enterprise College (in 2012)

Location
- Ryhall Road, Great Casterton; Stamford, Lincolnshire, PE9 4AT; England

Information
- Type: Academy
- Local authority: Rutland County Council
- Department for Education URN: 137340 Tables
- Ofsted: Reports
- Head teacher: Carl Smith
- Gender: Mixed
- Age range: 11-16
- Enrolment: 872
- Capacity: 900
- Website: School website

Casterton College, Rutland (previously Casterton Business and Enterprise College (CBEC) and Casterton Community College) is one of three secondary schools in the county of Rutland, England.

Located in the village of Great Casterton, the school provides education for eleven- to sixteen-year-olds, as well as a Childcare Centre for the under fives and an adult education programme. It opened as Great Casterton Secondary Modern School in 1939.

== Geography ==
The catchment area is the eastern part of Rutland including Cottesmore, Empingham and Ketton but the college attracts many of its students from Stamford, across the Lincolnshire boundary.

=== Roman archaeology ===
In the early 1950s the University of Nottingham held a two-week archaeological summer school at the school, run by Philip Corder, assisted by Maurice Barley. Also attending was John Pearson Gillam, of Durham University, and Brian Hartley (archaeologist). Roman excavations had been investigated for the previous four years by boys from Oakham School.

Frank Healey discovered the Roman site in 1947. Items found resembled objects found at Swanpool, Lincoln. Sir Mortimer Wheeler visited in 1953, and Prof Ian Richmond, of Newcastle University, with both giving lectures at the school.

The school is built near a large Roman site.

== History ==
=== Secondary modern school ===
The main building was built for Rutland County Education Committee, at the same time as Oakham Secondary School, under the same contract, in the mid-1950s.

In January 1954, the Chairman of the Education Committee, Lieutenant-Colonel G K F Ruddle visited the school, and agreed that three acres be bought, for playing fields, to the north of the school.

Cottesmore Secondary School closed in April 1954, with secondary-school-age children moving to the new buildings at the Oakham and Casterton secondary schools. The Cottesmore school had opened in 1920, in wooden huts. The wooden huts were moved to Uppingham. The Casterton school was short of a classroom by 1955.

=== Comprehensive ===
In December 1986, the school was given a drinks licence by Rutland magistrates.

In 1988, plans submitted for new modern languages classrooms and a science laboratory, to cost around £120,000.

An Ofsted 14-strong team investigated the school in January 1994, and the report said that the school was 'well-managed and operating with clear policies'. Improvements were urged by Ofsted, according to the report. The second Ofsted inspection was in March 1998.

In the November 1993 speech day, prizes were handed out by the Chairman of Leicestershire County Council, Duncan Lucas.

In November 1995 the principal wanted the school to be grant-maintained, given parental support in December 1995. There were now 750 at the school.

=== Independent Rutland ===
From April 1997 the school was part of Rutland unitary authority. The Millennium Block was opened on 25 August 1999, with nine new classrooms.

In November 1999, the prizes were handed out at the speech day by Gp Capt David Walker, the station commander of RAF Cottesmore.

=== Academy ===
Prior to academy conversion, the school had been rated as ‘outstanding’ in 2010. In December 2014, Ofsted rated the college as ‘requires improvement’ in all areas (teaching, behaviour, leadership and achievement). The then principal Victoria Crosher defended the fall in rating as partly due to changes in the "C" boundary at GCSE.

With the withdrawal of the Tresham Institute from providing post-16 education in Rutland, CBEC in 2010 took over responsibility for Rutland College which was renamed Rutland County College. In 2015 it consulted on moving its entire sixth form from Oakham to its Casterton site. However, in March 2017, the college announced that the sixth form would be closing as not enough students showed interest to study there.

Casterton College is joined with Ryhall Primary School and also with Casterton Childcare Centre. This means that the total group of education ranges from nursery to 16: Casterton Childcare Centre, Ryhall Primary School, Casterton College.

== Headteachers ==
- Edward George Bolton, the headteacher for 25 years until March 1964, died suddenly on Wednesday 25 November 1964, aged 65 at his home in Empingham.
- April 1964, Dougie Wright, he died in November 1997
- January 1983, Richard Bird, former deputy head of Stowupland High School in Suffolk.
- April 2015, Carl Smith, the current headteacher as of June 2026.
