= Odeon Cinema, North End =

Former cinema in Portsmouth, England

- The monolithic tower and former entrance in 2021

General information
- Type: Former Cinema
- Architectural style: Art Deco
- Location: Portsmouth, England
- Coordinates: 50°48′57.8″N 1°04′43.6″W
- Opened: December 1936
- Closed: January 2008
- Demolished: April 2023
- Cost: £30,000
- Owner: Oscar Deutsch

Design and construction
- Architect: Andrew Mather

The Odeon Cinema, North End (also known as the Odeon Portsmouth or Odeon Theatre) is a former Odeon cinema located on London Road, Portsmouth, England. The cinema opened on 14 December 1936 and closed on 10 January 2008. When it opened it was the largest of the chain's cinemas. Since closure, the Art Deco façade has been retained and converted for retail use, while the auditorium has been demolished and replaced by housing.

== History ==
The Odeon, North End was one of the original Oscar Deutsch chain of Odeon Theatres that opened in 1936 at a cost of £30,000. The cinema was designed by Andrew Mather, one of the principal architects for Odeon cinemas at the time, who also designed the Odeon Luxe Leicester Square in 1937. In the year it was opened, Odeon, North End was the largest and most expensive Odeon cinema ever built.

The cinema was inaugurated with an opening ceremony by the Lord Mayor Councillor F. J. Spickernell and the Lady Mayoress, accompanied by the Band of the H.M. Royal Marines. The first film screened was the British comedy crime film Chick, starring Sydney Howard.

Originally a single-screen cinema, the total auditorium seating capacity was 1,824 (with 1,224 stall seats and 600 balcony seats). Modernisation in following decades gave it a total of four screens and a 1,298 seating capacity. The former Odeon cinema was the leading film venue in Portsmouth, until multiplex cinemas such as Vue in Gunwharf Quays opened in the early 21st century.

The Odeon, North End attracted numerous personal appearances from film stars including Alec Guinness, Margaret Lockwood, Jack Hawkins and Peter Sellers. In June 1941, actor George Formby staged a matinee performance at the cinema to help raise money for victims of air raids as part of a ten-day tour of bombed areas.

In 1958 a special screening was held of the film A Night to Remember with Commander Joseph Groves Boxhall as guest of honour. Boxhall, who was fourth officer aboard the Titanic, assisted the film's production with its historical accuracy. He was greeted by a guard of honour formed by cadets from HMS Victory in the foyer and later addressed the audience from the stage.

The 1960s have been described as the cinema's heyday, with the introduction of roadshow presentations and the popular Saturday Morning Pictures club for children. In 1964 the musical comedy film Mary Poppins was screened, breaking records by attracting 33,500 people in just one week.

As part of her Silver Jubilee celebrations and the Royal Navy Fleet Review, Queen Elizabeth II and Prince Philip visited on 29 June 1977. For the occasion, cinema manager Gerry Crane hired a local naval cadet force to parade and give a salute outside the cinema, and changed the foyer marquee to display "Loyal Greetings from the Odeon Portsmouth".

== Description ==
The cinema was built in the Art Deco style, with ornate decorative interiors and featured nautical themed reliefs to reflect the island city of Portsmouth, a tiered proscenium arch in the auditorium, and a monolithic tower façade, adorned in a cream faience (now overpainted), with vertical green bands and a red Spanish tiled roof. The "strong rusticated facing" of the tower entrance forms a landmark. Andrew Mather, its architect, also designed another, similar Odeon cinema in the city the previous year, at Festing Road in Southsea; this has been described as "pre-war 'pop' architecture on a lavish scale".

== Renovations ==
The Odeon, North End had several renovations throughout the 20th century. In March 1941 during World War II, the building suffered significant damage to its foyer when a high-explosive bomb detonated in an air raid, forcing its closure for six weeks for repairs. In 1960, it was closed for two-weeks for modernisation and the installation of 70mm projectors with a wide screen. In 1973, the cinema was divided to become a triple-screen cinema. The former balcony became Screen 1 (with 573 seats) and two adjacent screens (Screen 2 and 3 with 132 seats each) located in the rear stalls under the balcony.

In October 1990, a £250,000 overhaul added a fourth screen in the former front stalls area, a new screen fitted in Screen 1, an updated frontage, canopy, signs and a refitted foyer. Further refurbishments took place in late 1999, with a digital sound system added in Screen 1 and additional seating capacity for Screen 1 (631), Screen 2 (229), Screen 3 (179) and Screen 4 (259).

== Closure ==
The former entrance after its closure in 2008

The cinema was set to close on 14 November 2007 but relevant contracts had yet to be signed and agreed with by the owners. During this time, the cinema was given a temporary reprieve while legal negotiations continued over the leasehold of the site. Odeon confirmed the final closure date and the cinema closed on 10 January 2008. Days prior to the announcement of the cinema's closure, another local 1930s Art Deco cinema, the Carlton in Cosham, closed. Closure was enforced after the freehold on the building was sold by Odeon Theatres Ltd, due to competition with large screen multiplexes.

The final feature that took place at the Odeon, North End on the evening of 10 January 2008 was the American post-apocalyptic action thriller film I Am Legend. Of the 29 cinemas in Portsmouth before World War II, the Odeon, North End was one of the last picture palaces to close in the city, after 71 years in use.

Since closure, the foyer has been converted for retail use. In December 2008 it was an OJ's Discount Store. In December 2013, it was converted into a Sainsbury's Local supermarket, but this closed in 2019. By 2021, the foyer had become the Minutka Delikatesy Polish shop.

== Redevelopment ==
In 2017, a multimillion-pound plan was announced to redevelop the former cinema to make way for new housing. However, in the same year, the planning application was withdrawn to further develop the scheme. In January 2022, Portsmouth City Council approved the revised development scheme by Imperial Homes South Ltd. In April 2023, demolition of the auditorium building commenced to make way for 12 houses and 6 apartments. By the end of 2023, demolition of the former Odeon auditorium had finished. In April 2025, the 18 new homes were declared completed on the site of the former auditorium. The redeveloped site references its heritage through the street name Picture House Mews and Mather Court, named after the cinema's architect Andrew Mather.

== Bibliography ==
- Barker, John; Brown, Ron; Greer, Wally (1981). The cinemas of Portsmouth: a nostalgic reminder of the picture palaces of Portsmouth (1st ed.). Milestone Publications. ISBN 9780903852159. OCLC 924671921.
- Brown, Ron (2009). Cinemas and Theatres of Portsmouth from Old Photographs (1st ed.). Amberley Publishing. ISBN 9781848687851. OCLC 1263783456.
- Lloyd, David W. (1974). Buildings of Portsmouth and its Environs: A survey of the dockyard, defences, homes, churches, commercial, civic and public buildings. Portsmouth: City of Portsmouth. ISBN 0-901559-53-9.
- O'Brien, Charles; Bailey, Bruce; Pevsner, Nikolaus; Lloyd, David W. (2018). Hampshire: South. The Buildings of England. London: Yale University Press. ISBN 978-0-300-22503-7.
