= Silverstone =

Village in Northamptonshire, England

Coordinates: 52.090°N 1.024°W

- Location within Northamptonshire
- Population: 1,989 (2001 census); 2,176 (2011 census)
- OS grid reference: SP670440
- Civil parish: Silverstone
- Unitary authority: West Northamptonshire
- Ceremonial county: Northamptonshire
- Region: East Midlands
- Country: England
- Sovereign state: United Kingdom
- Post town: Towcester
- Postcode district: NN12
- Dialling code: 01327
- Police: Northamptonshire
- Fire: Northamptonshire
- Ambulance: East Midlands
- UK Parliament: Northamptonshire South
- Website: Silverstone Parish Council

Silverstone (/sɪlvəstən/) is a village and civil parish in West Northamptonshire, England. The village is about 3.5 miles (5.6 km) south-southwest of Towcester and 6.5 miles (10.5 km) northeast of Brackley, both accessed via the A43 main road which now bypasses Silverstone to the south and east. The village is also about 11.5 miles (18.5 km) south-southwest of Northampton, 12 miles (19 km) west-northwest of Milton Keynes, and 13.5 miles (21.7 km) east-northeast of Banbury. The population of the civil parish at the 2011 census was 2,176.

The village's name probably means 'farm/settlement of Saewulf/Sigewulf'.

The Silverstone Circuit, the current home of the British Grand Prix and the British motorcycle Grand Prix, is located nearby; it straddles the Northamptonshire and Buckinghamshire border.

The village is listed in the Domesday Book of 1086 as Silvestone and Selvestone.

== Parish church ==
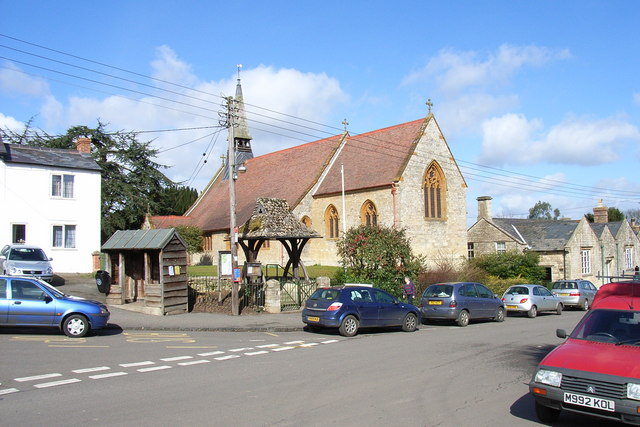
St. Michael's Church, Silverstone

Silverstone had a chapel by 1200 CE. In about 1780 the medieval building was replaced by a Georgian one, which was enlarged by the addition of a chancel in 1841 and a north aisle and vestry in 1852. The entire church was demolished in the 1880s and replaced by the present Church of England parish church of Saint Michael, which is a Gothic Revival building designed by James Piers St Aubyn and completed in 1884.

On the north side of the parish churchyard are the remains of medieval fish ponds.

== Facilities ==
The village has one public house: the White Horse Inn.

About one-half mile (one kilometre) south of the village is the Silverstone Circuit, a former Royal Air Force World War II bomber base and now the traditional home of the British Grand Prix, a Formula One race that attracts around 480,000 visitors each year.

Silverstone University Technical College opened at the circuit in September 2013.

Adjacent to Silverstone Circuit is Silverstone Park, a business park operated by MEPC plc, with a focus on engineering and high-tech activities. The site is home to over 80 organisations, including David Brown Automotive, Delta Motorsport, Ducati UK Ltd, National College for Motorsport, Danecca Limited, Hexagon Manufacturing Intelligence, ELMS team Vector Sport, and Formula E teams Envision Racing and Cupra Kiro. It also features the UK's only dedicated sub-contract inspection metrology facility, managed by Hexagon Manufacturing Intelligence, a technical partner to Red Bull Formula 1.

Silverstone is also the base of the Formula One constructor Aston Martin, formerly known as Racing Point, Force India and Jordan, and is also the British base of Cadillac Formula 1 Team. The Formula 2 team Hitech Grand Prix is also based in Silverstone.

In the Middle Ages, the village trade was primarily in timber from the surrounding Whittlewood forest through the use of coppicing. Linnell Brothers still operate a woodyard to this day.

Many campsites lay in and near the village of Silverstone. They are mainly opened when the MotoGP, Formula 1 and Car Fest take place at the Silverstone Circuit. Some of the campsites include: Silverstone Woodlands Campsite, Silverstone Golf Club Campsite, Silverstone Farm Campsite, Hamilton Fields Campsite, Pitstop Glamping and Dadford Road Camping. Below will be some information about the campsites.

Silverstone Woodlands Campsite lays adjacent to the circuit and takes about 2 minutes to walk to the grand stands. It lays next to gates 14 and 15. The Silverstone Golf Club Campsite is also adjacent to the circuit and has a private bridge leading over to the circuit and grandstands. Silverstone Farm Campsite lays just off the Little London as well as Church Street and takes about 12 minutes to walk/cycle to the Copse and Becketts gate. The Hamilton Fields lays just off Main Road and takes about 17 minutes to walk/cycle to the track at Copse Corner. Pitstop Glamping lays off of Dadford Road and takes around 17 minutes to walk/cycle to the West Track Gates. Finally, Dadford Road Camping lays off of Dadford Road and takes around 12 minutes to walk/cycle to the South Track Gates.
