= Silverstone University Technical College =

Location
- Silverstone Circuit; Silverstone, Northamptonshire, NN12 8TL; England; 52°04′46″N 1°00′56″W

Information
- Type: University Technical College
- Motto: Building High Performing, Work Ready Young People
- Established: 2013
- Department for Education URN: 139690 Tables
- Ofsted: Reports
- Principal: Angela Murphy
- Years offered: 10-13
- Gender: Mixed
- Age: 14 to 18
- Enrolment: 465
- Website: http://www.utc-silverstone.co.uk/

Silverstone University Technical College (or Silverstone UTC) is a university technical college (UTC) that opened at the Silverstone Circuit in Northamptonshire, England in September 2013. The UTC specialises in High Performance Engineering and Business & Technical Events Management for 14- to 19-year-olds.

The UTC was officially opened by Adrian Newey in May 2014.

The University of Northampton and Tresham College are the lead academic sponsors of Silverstone UTC, while Silverstone Circuit is the lead business sponsor.
