= List of schools in Hartlepool =

This is a list of schools in the Borough of Hartlepool in County Durham, England.

== State-funded schools ==
=== Primary schools ===
- Barnard Grove Primary School
- Brougham Primary School
- Clavering Primary School
- Eldon Grove Academy
- Eskdale Academy
- Fens Primary School
- Golden Flatts Primary School
- Grange Primary School
- Greatham CE Primary School
- Hart Primary School
- Holy Trinity CE Primary School
- Jesmond Gardens Primary School
- Kingsley Primary School
- Lynnfield Primary School
- Rift House Primary School
- Rossmere Academy
- Sacred Heart RC Primary School
- St Aidan's CE Memorial Primary School
- St Bega's RC Primary School
- St Cuthbert's RC Primary School
- St Helen's Primary School
- St John Vianney RC Primary School
- St Joseph's RC Primary School
- St Peter's Elwick CE Primary School
- St Teresa's RC Primary School
- Stranton Primary School
- Throston Primary School
- Ward Jackson Primary School
- West Park Primary School
- West View Primary School

=== Secondary schools ===
- Dyke House Academy
- English Martyrs School and Sixth Form College
- High Tunstall College of Science
- Manor Community Academy
- St Hild's Church of England School

=== Special and alternative schools ===
- Catcote Academy
- The Horizon School
- Springwell School

=== Further education ===
- Hartlepool College of Further Education
- Hartlepool Sixth Form College

== Independent schools ==
=== Special and alternative schools ===
- Cambian Hartlepool School
- Wrenfield Learning Centre
