= Kingston, Hampshire =

Suburb of Portsmouth, Hampshire, England

Coordinates: 50.803°N 1.066°W

Kingston is a residential area of the city of Portsmouth in the English county of Hampshire, lying between Buckland, Fratton, Milton and North End. It was a recognised suburb of the city by the middle of the 19th century.

Kingston Road has several shops, cafes and churches. Kingston was bombed in World War II when new housing had just been built. It was not until the early 1960s that it was revitalized. It is the location of the former Kingston Prison.

== Churches ==
The area was for a time home to the parish church for the entirety of Portsea island. This ceased to be the case in the 14th century when old Portsmouth was split off.

The current church of St Mary was built between 1887 and 1889 to a design by Arthur Blomfield.
