= List of schools in Portsmouth =

This is a list of schools in Portsmouth, in the English county of Hampshire.

== State-funded schools ==
=== Primary schools ===
- Ark Ayrton Primary Academy, Southsea
- Ark Dickens Primary Academy, Buckland
- Arundel Court Primary Academy, Landport
- Beacon View Primary Academy, Paulsgrove
- Bramble Infant School, Southsea
- Copnor Primary School, Copnor
- Corpus Christi RC Primary School, North End
- Cottage Grove Primary School, Southsea
- Court Lane Infant Academy, Cosham
- Court Lane Junior Academy, Cosham
- Craneswater Junior School, Southsea
- Cumberland Infant School, Southsea
- Devonshire Infant School, Southsea
- Fernhurst Junior School, Southsea
- The Flying Bull Academy, Buckland
- Gatcombe Park Primary School, Hilsea
- Highbury Primary School, Cosham
- King's Academy Infant College Park, Copnor
- King's Academy Junior College Park, Copnor
- King's Infant Academy Northern Parade, Hilsea
- King's Junior Academy Northern Parade, Hilsea
- Langstone Infant School, Milton
- Langstone Junior Academy, Milton
- Manor Infant School, Fratton
- Mayfield School, North End
- Medina Primary School, Cosham
- Meon Infant School, Milton
- Meon Junior School, Milton
- Milton Park Primary School, Milton
- Moorings Way Infant School, Southsea
- New Horizons Primary School, North End
- Penbridge Infant School, Fratton
- Penbridge Junior School, North End
- Portsdown Primary School, Cosham
- St George's Beneficial CE Primary School, Portsea
- St John's Cathedral RC Primary School, Landport
- St Jude's CE Primary School, Southsea
- St Paul's RC Primary School, Cosham
- St Swithun's RC Primary School, Southsea
- Solent Infant School, Farlington
- Solent Junior School, Drayton
- Southsea Infant School, Southsea
- Stamshaw Infant Academy, Stamshaw
- Stamshaw Junior School, Stamshaw
- The Victory Primary School, Paulsgrove
- Westover Primary School, Milton
- Wimborne Primary School, Southsea

=== Secondary schools ===
- Admiral Lord Nelson School, Copnor
- Ark Charter Academy, Landport
- Castle View Academy, Paulsgrove
- Mayfield School, North End
- Miltoncross Academy, Milton
- The Portsmouth Academy, Fratton
- Priory School, Southsea
- St Edmund's Catholic School, Landport
- Springfield School, Drayton
- Trafalgar School, Hilsea
- UTC Portsmouth, Hilsea

=== Special and alternative schools ===
- Cliffdale Primary Academy, North End
- The Harbour School, Tipner
- Mary Rose Academy, Southsea
- Redwood Park Academy, Cosham
- The Wymering School, Cosham

=== Further education ===
- Highbury College, Cosham
- Portsmouth College, Baffins

== Independent schools ==
=== Senior and all-through schools ===
- Madani Academy, Buckland
- Mayville High School, Southsea
- Portsmouth Grammar School, Old Portsmouth
- Portsmouth High School, Southsea
