= Lindsay Johnson =

English footballer

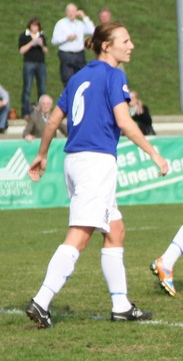

Personal information
- Date of birth: 8 May 1980 (age 46)
- Place of birth: Hartlepool, England
- Height: 5 ft 6 in (1.68 m)
- Position: Defender

Senior career*
Years	Team	Apps	(Gls)
- Coventry City
2001–2003	Liverpool Ladies		
2003–2015	Everton Ladies		

International career^{‡}
2004–2011	England	43	(1)
- * Club domestic league appearances and goals ‡ National team caps and goals as of 08:56, 28 March 2011 (UTC)

Lindsay Johnson (born 8 May 1980) is an English former footballer who played defense for Everton Ladies and the England women's national football team.

== Early life ==
Johnson was born in Hartlepool. She was educated at Fens Primary School, Manor College of Technology, and Hartlepool Sixth Form College. Her interest in sport in general began at a very early age. At the age of six years, she began athletics training, although was not allowed to compete until the age of eight years. She went on to represent her county at 200m and the long jump and also represented her county at hockey and netball.

== Club career ==
Johnson's football career began at the age of 11 years when she joined a girls club. She also played for Coventry City on one or two occasions while attending Manchester Metropolitan University. However, her Premier League career began relatively late when she joined Liverpool Ladies, from where she joined Everton Ladies in 2003. Everton fans gave her the nickname "Lindsay Lightning" due to her pace. She played for Everton in their 1–0 FA Women's Cup Final defeat to Charlton Athletic Ladies in 2005, earning the Player of the Match award. She also played in Everton's League Cup win in 2008, beating Arsenal Ladies in the final.

Johnson's loyalty to Everton was rewarded with another two Cup finals in 2010: a 3–1 defeat by Leeds Carnegie in the Premier League Cup, in which Fara Williams scored Everton's consolation, followed by a memorable extra–time win over Arsenal in the FA Women's Cup.

When the 2014 season culminated in Everton's relegation, Johnson postponed her plans to retire and decided to play on for another season in FA WSL 2. In October 2015, she confirmed that Everton's match against Oxford United would be her last. Johnson marked the occasion with a goal in Everton's 5–3 win.

== International career ==
Johnson represented England at Under-21 level, before making her senior debut against the Netherlands in September 2004. Her performances during the following season's Algarve Cup ensured a regular place in coach Hope Powell's England squad.

Although initially left out of the 2007 World Cup squad, she was included as a late replacement for Steph Houghton, who sustained a fractured fibula in training.

In May 2009, Johnson was one of the first 17 female players to be given central contracts by the Football Association. That August she was named in the squad for the Women's UEFA 2009, her versatility meaning she could provide cover for injury worries Alex Scott and Faye White. She replaced White in the first half of the quarter-final game against Finland and played all of the semi-final extra-time victory against the Netherlands.

Johnson was allotted 153 when the FA announced their legacy numbers scheme to honour the 50th anniversary of England’s inaugural international.

== Personal life ==
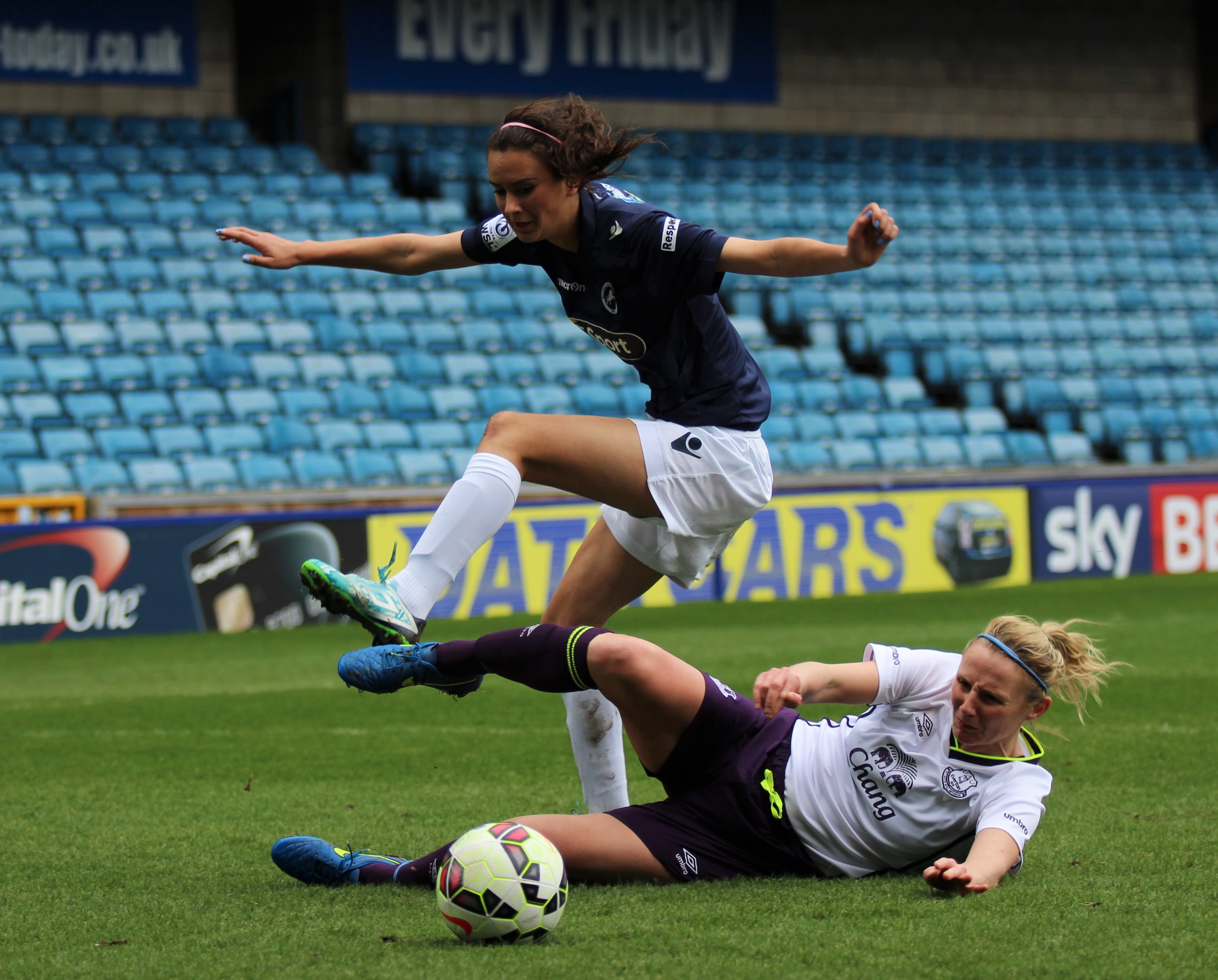
Slide-tackling Rosella Ayane of Millwall in March 2015

Johnson was a PE teacher at The King's Academy, but later transitioned to a career in football and gave up her teaching career to focus on her football career. She served as a mentor and trainer for BTEC students studying fitness and sports development at Cardinal Heenan Sports College. She contributed to SHAPE initiative that aims to promote health and physical activity among children in central Liverpool. Johnson was at Cardinal Heenan for 17 years and left her position as Assistant Headteacher to join Withington Girls' School as Director of Sport.

She is related to Jenny Wilkes, also a footballer; who plays for Newcastle United Women and England at Junior level.

== Career statistics ==
=== International goal ===
Scores and results list England's goal tally first.

Goal	Date	Venue	Opponent	Result	Competition	Scored
1	23 April 2009	New Meadow, Shrewsbury	Norway	3–0	Friendly	1

== Honours ==
Everton

- FA Women's Cup: 2009–10
- FA Women's Premier League Cup: 2007–08

England

- Cyprus Cup: 2009
