= Rutland County College =

Coordinates: 52.6750°N 0.7365°W

Location
- Barleythorpe Road; Oakham, Rutland, LE15 6QH; England

Information
- Type: post-16 college
- Local authority: Rutland County Council
- Ofsted: Reports
- Gender: Coeducational
- Age: 16+
- Former names: Rutland Sixth Form College, Rutland College
- Website: http://www.rutlandcountycollege.com/

Rutland County College was a post-16 (or sixth-form) college, based mainly in Oakham, Rutland, England. In September 2012 it opened on a new site in Barleythorpe on the outskirts of Oakham. However, the college was meant to move to its main campus in Casterton. The new Sixth Form was going to be renamed CCR6 and would have opened in September 2017. In September 2016, however, the college announced closure of its Year 12 provision for that year, because of low numbers of students applying to it. In June 2017 the remaining provision was also closed and the college ceased to operate.

Previously called Rutland Sixth Form College, it was built on the site of the historic girls' grammar school for Rutland, originally known as Rutland High School for Girls. It was incorporated into Tresham College in August 2000, changing its name to Rutland College.

In 2009 Tresham Institute announced its intention to withdraw from Oakham. Tresham sold the existing buildings and land, leaving the local community to find a new site and the capital to build a new 16-19 college. In autumn 2009 Rutland County Council announced that Casterton Business and Enterprise College (an 11-16 community college) would take responsibility, in partnership with the County Council and Tresham, for managing the college and would provide 100 sixth form places at its Great Casterton site in addition to Oakham. The second phase of the proposal included moving to a new site and in November 2010 it was announced that the College would relocate to occupy the former EEF Conference Centre in Barleythorpe in September 2012.

The College prospectus described a new post-16 programme with a range of courses including ‘A Level’ subjects, the new 14-19 diplomas, apprenticeships, or career specific ‘vocational’ training.

The College was judged Outstanding by Ofsted in November 2010, although in November 2014 the College was judged to 'require improvement'.

Former and participating students formed the 'Hand-stitched Theatre Company' who were rated four stars at the Edinburgh Fringe Festival.

== Notable former pupils ==
=== Rutland Sixth Form College ===
- Elizabeth Berridge, Baroness Berridge
- John Browett, Chief Executive since January 2016 of Dunelm Group, from March 2013 - February 2015 of Monsoon Accessorize, and from 1999-2004 of Tesco.com
- Claire Henry MBE, nurse, Chief Executive since 2014 of the National Council for Palliative Care

=== Rutland High School for Girls ===
- Penny Smith, former GMTV newsreader, and radio presenter
