= List of schools in Torbay =

This is a list of schools in Torbay in the English county of Devon.

== State-funded schools ==
=== Primary schools ===
- All Saints Babbacombe CE Primary School, Torquay
- Barton Hill Academy, Torquay
- Brixham CE Primary School, Brixham
- Cockington Community Primary School, Torquay
- Collaton St Mary CE Primary School, Paignton
- Curledge Street Academy, Paignton
- Eden Park Primary School, Brixham
- Ellacombe CE Academy, Torquay
- Furzeham Primary School, Brixham
- Galmpton CE Primary School, Brixham
- Hayes School, Paignton
- Homelands Primary School, Torquay
- Ilsham CE Academy, Torquay
- Kings Ash Academy, Paignton
- Oldway Primary School, Paignton
- Our Lady of the Angels RC Primary School, Torquay
- Preston Primary School, Torquay
- Priory RC Primary School, Torquay
- Roselands Primary School, Paignton
- Sacred Heart Catholic RC School, Paignton
- Sherwell Valley Primary School, Torquay
- Shiphay Learning Academy, Torquay
- St Margaret Clitherow RC Primary School, Brixham
- St Margaret's Academy, Torquay
- St Marychurch CE Primary School, Torquay
- St Michael's CE Academy, Paignton
- Torre CE Academy, Torquay
- Upton St James CE Primary School, Torquay
- Warberry CE Academy, Torquay
- Watcombe Primary School, Torquay
- White Rock Primary School, Paignton

=== Non-selective secondary schools ===
- Brixham College, Brixham
- Paignton Academy, Paignton
- St Cuthbert Mayne School, Torquay
- The Spires College, Torquay
- Torquay Academy, Torquay

=== Grammar schools ===
- Churston Ferrers Grammar School, Brixham
- Torquay Boys' Grammar School, Torquay
- Torquay Girls' Grammar School, Torquay

=== Special and alternative schools ===
- The Brunel Academy, Paignton
- The Burton Academy, Torquay
- Combe Pafford School, Torquay
- Mayfield School, Torquay

=== Further education ===
- South Devon College, Paignton

== Independent schools ==
=== Primary and preparatory schools ===
- Abbey School, Torquay

=== Special and alternative schools ===
- Phoenix Bay School, Torquay
- Preston Bridge School, Paignton
- TLG Torbay, Torquay

== Sources ==
"List of all school establishments in Torbay".
