= North End, Hampshire =

Neighbourhood of Portsmouth, Hampshire, England

Coordinates: 50.816921°N 1.079586°W

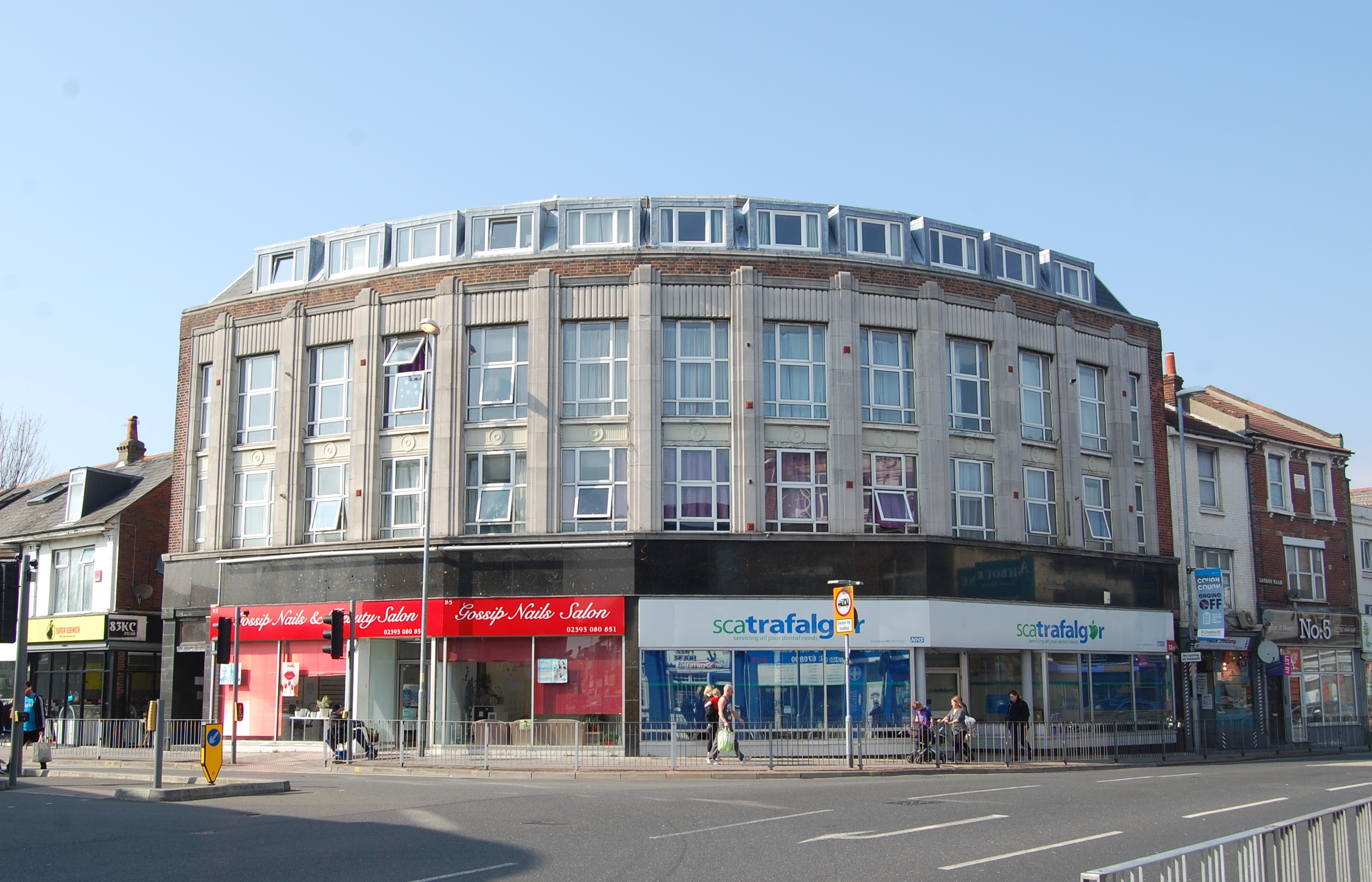
The Montague Burton Building at the corner of London Road in North End

North End is a district in the city of Portsmouth, located on Portsea Island in Hampshire. The area developed rapidly as a part of the city after a horse-drawn tram route was opened between Portsmouth and Cosham. The area is mainly residential, being composed of mainly late Victorian to early 20th-century buildings.

== Name ==
North End's name is derived from its origin as a northern expansion of the (then) village of Kingston, forming the "northern end" of Kingston.

== History ==
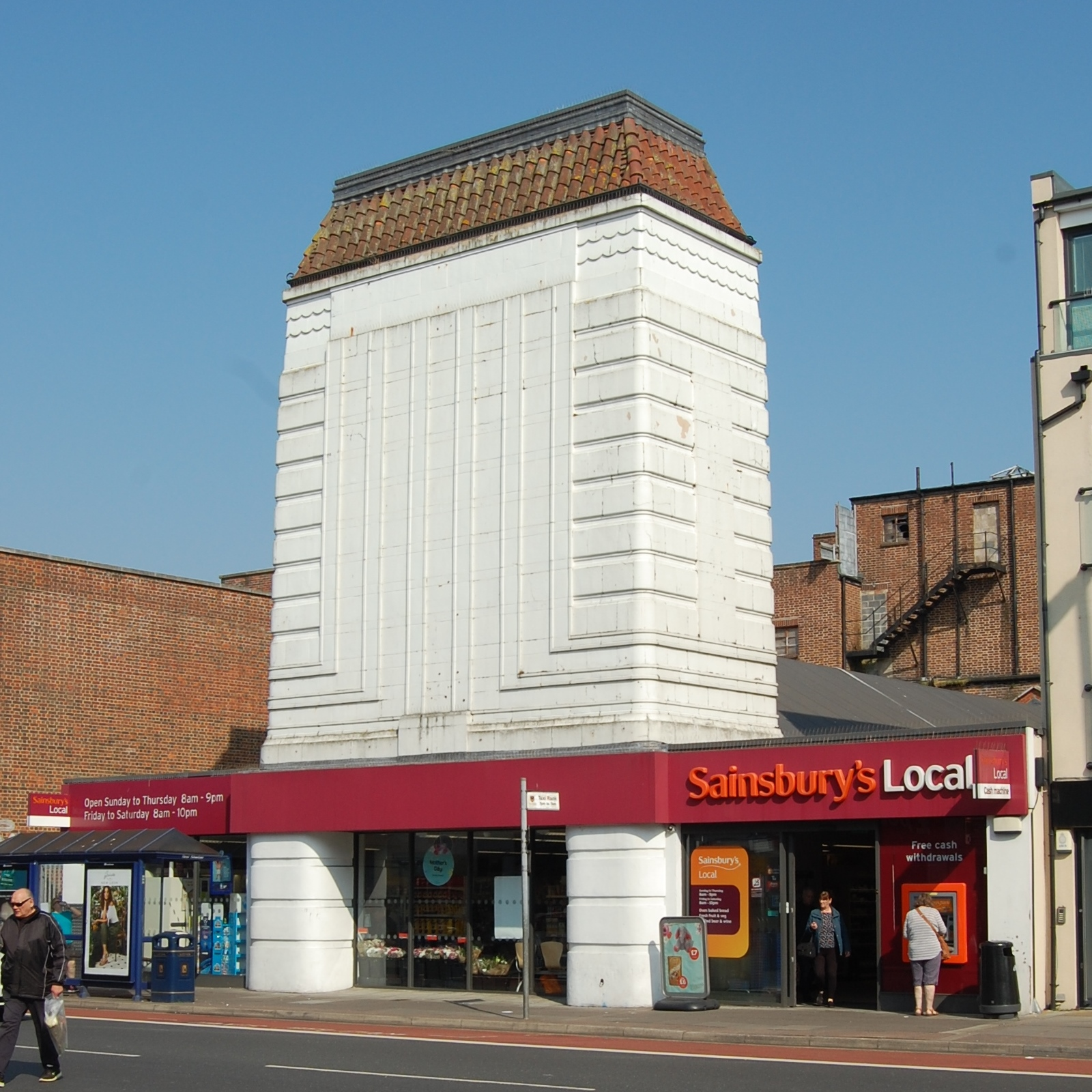
The Former Odeon Cinema at 94 London Road, seen in 2019

North End is built on land which was formerly Stubbington Farm, part of which retains the street name of Stubbington Avenue. The housing around the Laburnum Grove area of North End was developed in the late 1890s. Many of the houses were originally externally decorated with tiles sourced from the Blackwall Tunnel and some named the street Lavatory Lane as a result. Laburnum Grove itself was a popular area for Royal Navy officers to live and was also historically referred to as Brass-Button Alley.

The Odeon cinema, opened in 1936 and was built in the Art Deco style by Andrew Mather. The cinema was a prominent local landmark in the area until it closed on January 10, 2008, after Odeon sold the cinema to a property developer. The foyer of the building was converted for retail use and turned into an OJ's Discount Store in December 2008. In April 2012, Sainsbury's announced they would take over the space and convert the foyer in addition to its neighbouring retail units into a Sainsbury's Local store, which opened in December 2012. The store closed in October 2019 and since 2020, a Polish supermarket has accompanied the space. The auditorium buildings remained intact, although in extremely poor condition, and planning permission was soon granted to demolish the structure and replace it with new housing. In April 2023, building work commenced.

== Geography ==
North End is bounded to the west by Stamshaw, to the south by Buckland and Kingston, to the east by Copnor and by Hilsea to the north.

North End is part of the Portsmouth North Parliamentary constituency.

== Shopping, leisure and recreation ==
North End continues to support a wide range of small traders, supermarkets and other retailers, as well as a variety of pubs and budget fast food outlets.

A public library operates near the junction of North End with Gladys Avenue.

== Education ==
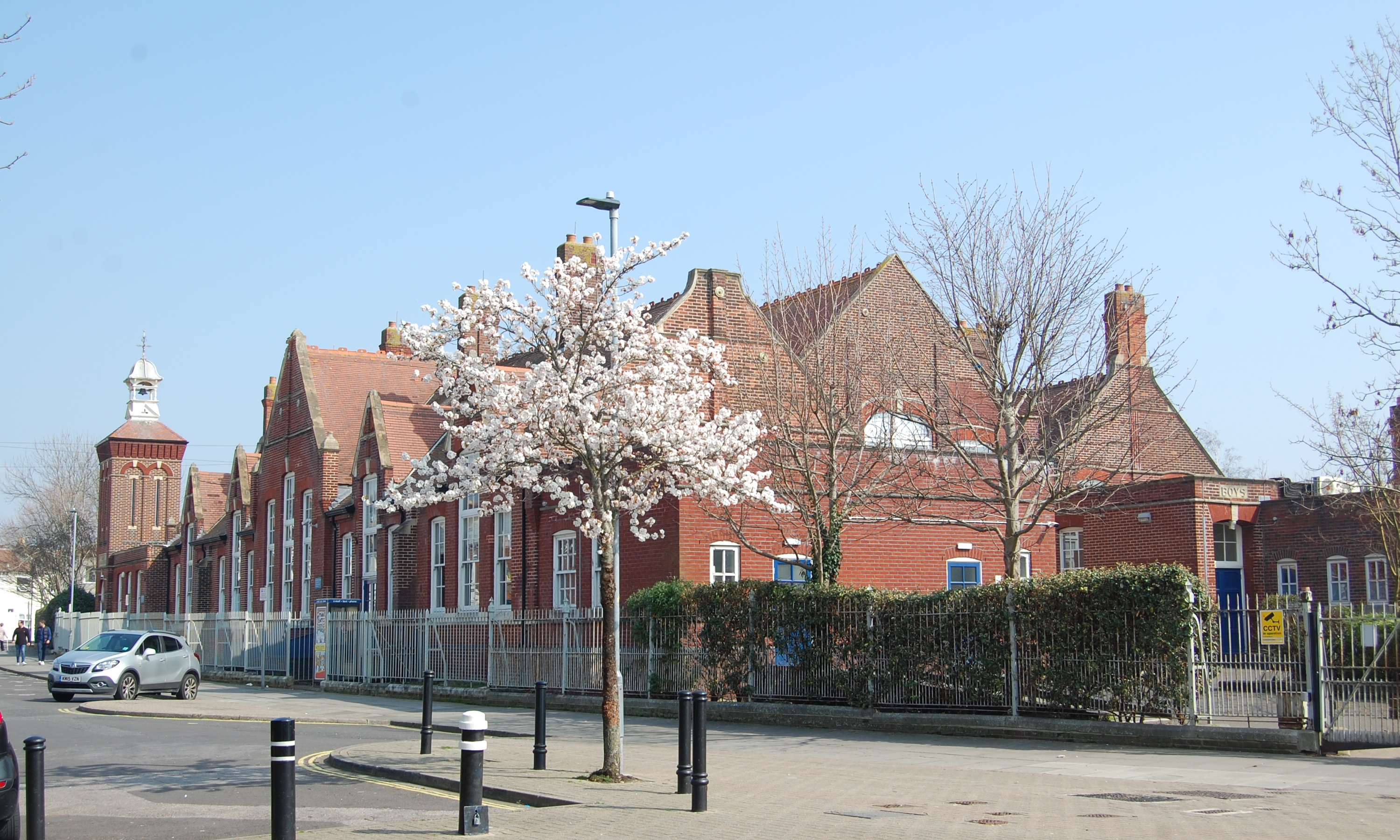
Stamshaw Infants School on North End Avenue

Stamshaw Junior School is a junior school on North End Avenue in North End.

Meredith infant school and Isambard Brunel Junior School were adjacent schools in North End that closed in 2019. The two schools later merged to become New Horizons Primary School on Portchester Road.

== Religious sites ==
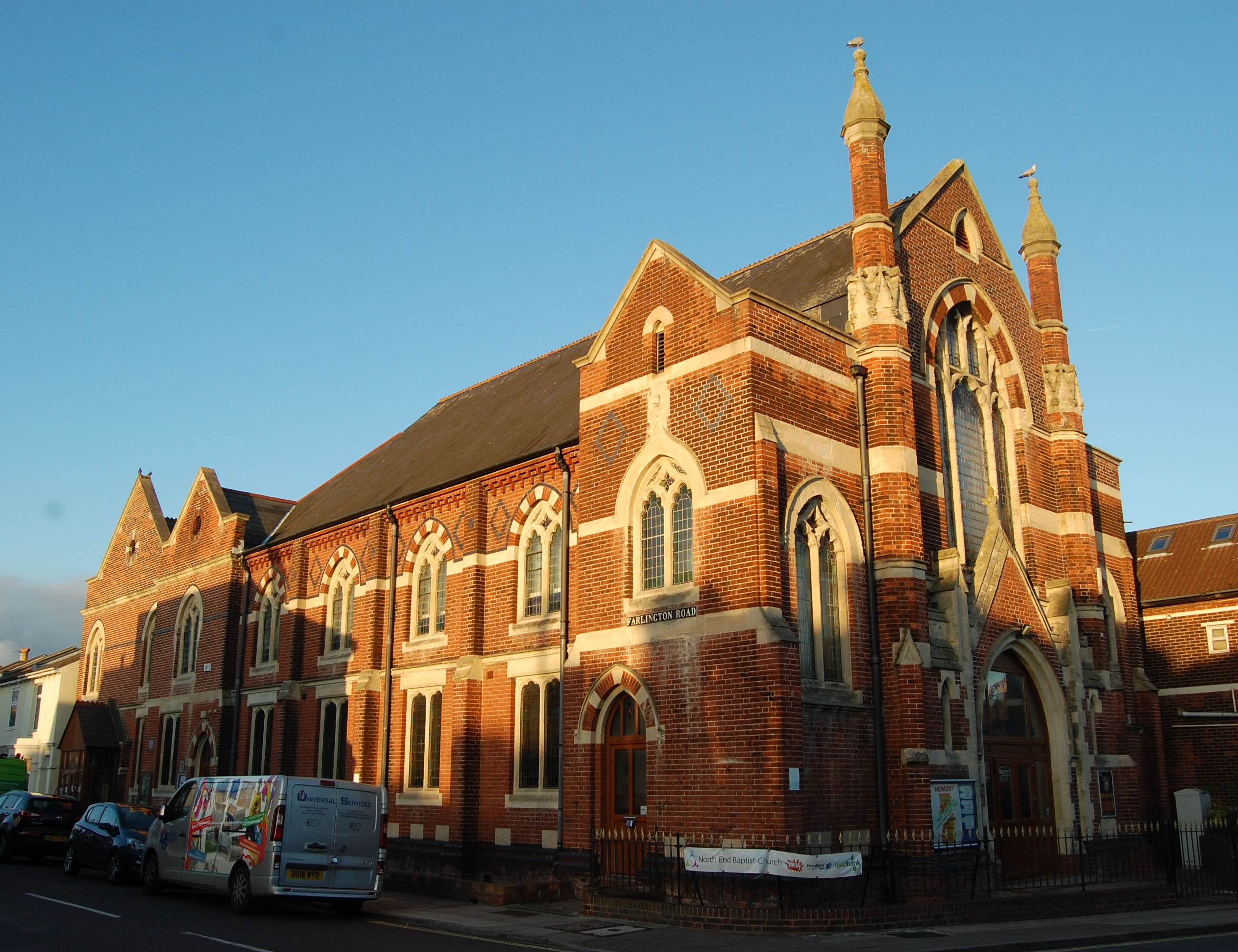
North End Baptist Church

There are two main Anglican churches in the area:

- St Mark, Portsea, which is sited in Derby Road just off the main London Road shopping centre. The church stood from 1874 to 1970 on the corner of London Road with Derby Road, before being rebuilt in the late 1960s at its present site in Derby Road opposite the former site.
- The Church of the Ascension in Stubbington Avenue, which was carved out of the old St Mark's Parish. The worship at this church is high Anglican.

There is a Roman Catholic church on Gladys Avenue, Corpus Christi and St Joseph. It was built between 1892 and 1904 with a significant pause after 1893. The Church’s altar was previously used at a Convent in Ryde.

There is also a Baptist church on Powerscourt road in a building that previously belonged to the Bible Christian Methodist Church. A previous Baptist church existed at 21 London Road which was built in 1894 but closed in 2001. The building was eventually sold to the Barracuda Group in 2004 and reopened as a public house named "The Lanyard" in January 2005, later renamed "The Grapes" and "Antique Bar". Currently, the building is home to a Darts lounge.
