= Whitefield Schools =

Location
- Macdonald Road; Walthamstow, London, E17 4AZ; England; 51°35′42″N 0°00′07″W

Information
- Type: Special school; Academy
- Established: 1903
- Trust: Flourish Learning Trust
- Department for Education URN: 140795 Tables
- Ofsted: Reports
- Principal: Elaine Colquhoun
- Gender: Boys/girls
- Age: 3 to 19
- Enrolment: +300
- Website: http://www.whitefield.org.uk/

Whitefield Schools is a special school in Walthamstow in the London Borough of Waltham Forest, offering support for children with a wide range of special physical, educational and behavioural needs and difficulties.

The school is part of the Flourish Learning Trust. Previously it had become part of the Whitefield Academy Trust multi-academy trust in April 2014. The same site also contains the Whitefield's Research and Development Centre, home of the academy's training functions, an outreach service and a specialist library.

There are three 'sub-schools' within Whitefield schools:

- Peter Turner Primary School – For pupils aged 3–11 years old with autism or speech and communication difficulties.
- Niels Chapman Secondary School – For pupils aged 11–19 years old.
- Margaret Brearley School – For pupils aged 3–19 years old with more complex needs including learning difficulties, physical impairment and sensory impairment.

Joseph Clarke School was also part of Whitefield Academy Trust.

In 2017, Ofsted rated the school as inadequate due to the serious misuse of calming rooms, which the school states are no longer used. Previously the school had been rated as outstanding. Parents had been largely unaware of these rooms and their usage.

== Child abuse incidents ==
In 2021, an inquiry into alleged systematic abuse at the school has been initiated following the discovery of CCTV footage showing students being assaulted and neglected in seclusion rooms from 2014 to 2017. The rooms were bare, unventilated, and locked from the outside. Staff were alleged to have assaulted students and left them in unsanitary conditions.

The abuse was discovered through CCTV footage found on 44 memory sticks, showing 39 non-verbal pupils subjected to neglect and abuse. A whistleblower equated the conditions to "torture" and criticized the school’s internal investigations. The Children's Commissioner for England has called for stricter regulations on seclusion rooms.

In 2024, some staff who were filmed allegedly abusing the students are still employed at the school and have not been barred from working with children. The Metropolitan police conducted a criminal investigation into alleged abuse from 2014 to 2017, but the Crown Prosecution Service concluded no further action should be taken based on the evidence available.
