= George Mitchell School =

Coordinates: 51°34′05″N 0°00′48″W

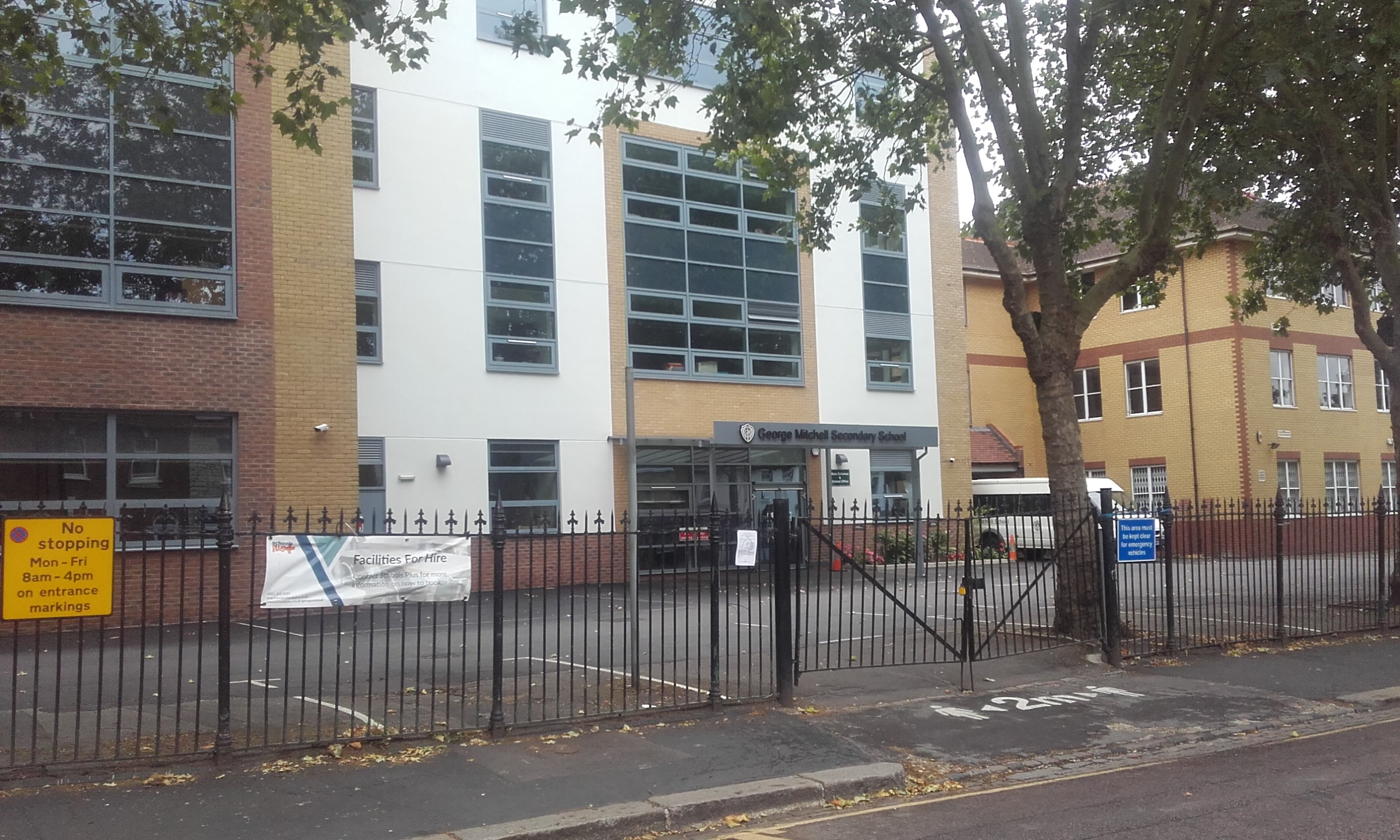
- George Mitchell School, 2017 building.

Location
- Farmer Road; Leyton; London, E10 5DN; England

Information
- Type: Academy
- Established: 1900
- Local authority: Waltham Forest
- Trust: Partnership Learning
- Department for Education URN: 145106 Tables
- Ofsted: Reports
- Headteacher: Benita Simmons
- Gender: Coeducational
- Age: 3 to 16
- Enrolment: 951
- Website: http://www.georgemitchellschool.com/

George Mitchell School is a coeducational all-through school located in Leyton in London, England.

It is attended by students who mainly live in the local area, with some from further afield. Examination results at the end of Key Stage 4 (i.e. the end of Year 11) have improved dramatically over recent years, as have the Key Stage 2 results. The school is currently located across several sites – on Crawley Road, Farmer Road, Burchell Road and Vicarage Road.

== Results ==
In 2014, GCSE results were 48% 5 A*–C with English/Maths. The UK national average for the same period is 55%. The Department of Education confirms that 85% of pupils at George Mitchell are making expected levels of progress in English which is the 11th percentile nationally. In Maths the figure is 74% which is the 1st percentile nationally. The soon to be (2016) headline figure of Progress 8 (Value Added measure) places George Mitchell in the 8th percentile nationally, value added 1034 compared to the national figure of 1000, which means the school is doing significantly better than other similar schools.

== History ==
The school was previously known as Farmer Road School. It started in 1900 in temporary premises; a permanent building was constructed during 1902 and opened on 15 June 1903 as an elementary school with separate departments for boys and girls aged 5 to 14, which was the statutory school leaving age at that time. In 1932, this changed to senior boys, junior boys, and mixed infants, but in 1942 the junior department became mixed again. In 1948 the school became a secondary modern school for boys. In 1968, Waltham Forest adopted the Comprehensive system and it became a "Junior High School", catering for 11- to 14-year-old boys. In 1986, it was re-organised again: it became co-educational, admitting both boys and girls from 11–16 years.

In 1947, when the school was reopened as a Secondary Modern it was renamed in honour of George Mitchell, a student who had attended the school from 1923 to 1927. He was posthumously awarded the Victoria Cross during the Second World War whilst serving as a member of the British Army during the fighting in Italy. The Victoria Cross was presented to Mitchell's family By King George VI in an investiture ceremony at Buckingham Palace on 17 July 1945. In 1949, his brother placed Mitchell's medal group in the care of George Mitchell School. In 2006, in an agreement organised by Mitchell's nephew, the medals were moved to the London Scottish Regimental Museum in Horseferry Road, London, The museum purchased the medals from the school for £150,000, which went towards the cost of a mobile classroom. Links are still maintained with Mitchell's regiment, the London Scottish, which was amalgamated into the London Regiment in 1992.

Another student of the school had also been awarded the Victoria Cross, Jack Cornwell, known as the “boy hero” of the Battle of Jutland in 1916 during the First World War, awarded posthumously. He was the youngest Naval recipient of the VC, being aged just 16. This makes the school the only comprehensive in England to have had two Victoria Cross winners as alumni.

In September 2009 the school expanded into an 'all through school' to take pupils from 3-16, absorbing a nearby primary school and nursery, Beaumont Primary School. The school operates across a total of five sites in close proximity but was included in the Government's Priority Schools Building Programme and will a new two-story primary school and a new secondary building was completed in 2017, and the primary department in October 2018. The plaque commemorating George Mitchell VC and various architectural carvings from façade the 1903 school have been preserved in the new building.

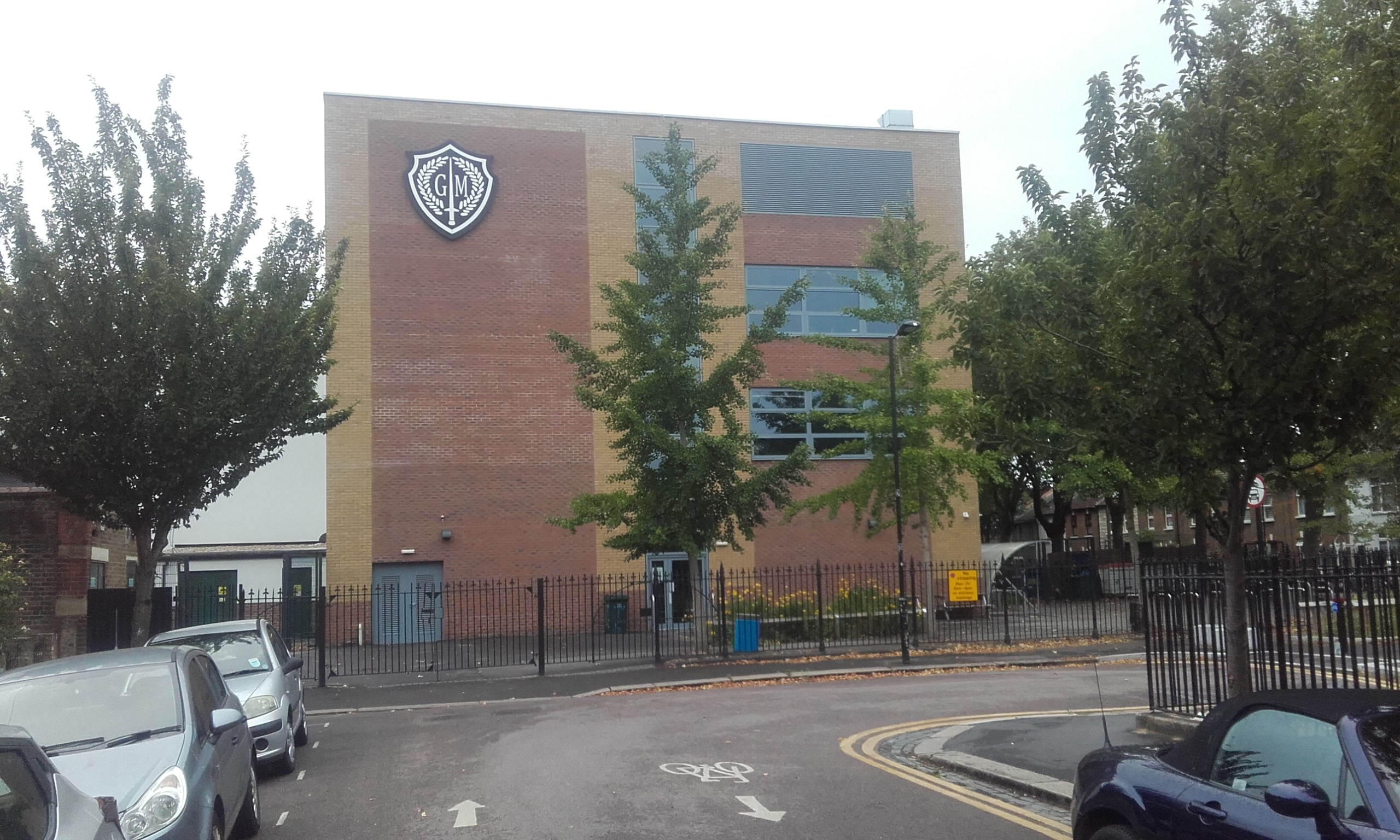
George Mitchell School from Farmer Road E10.

Previously a community school administered by Waltham Forest London Borough Council, in January 2019 George Mitchell School converted to academy status. The school is now sponsored by Partnership Learning.
