= Sisters of the Holy Cross Menzingen =

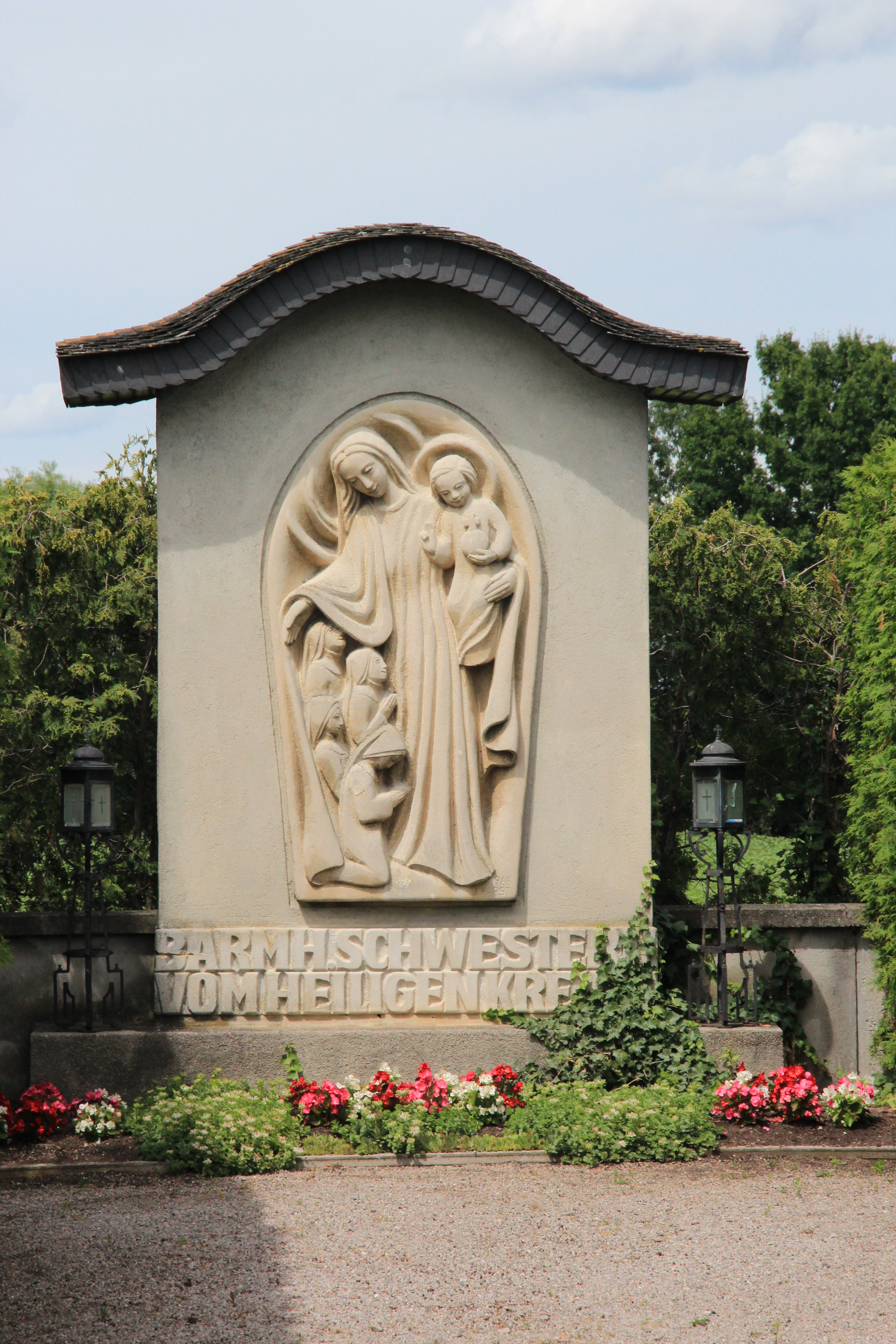

The Sisters of Holy Cross Menzingen is a religious congregation for women in the Roman Catholic Church. It was founded in 1844 in Menzingen, Canton Zug, Switzerland by a Capuchin priest and venerable Bernarda Heimgartner. The order is now international with about 1700 sisters.

== History ==
=== Theodosius Florentini ===
Theodosius Florentini OFMCap envisaged a religious congregation of teachers who would educate children, especially girls, who as future mothers would preserve the faith in their families. Thus, he founded the Congregation of the Sisters of the Holy Cross in October 1844 with three young ladies, Maria Anna Heimgartner (later Mother Bernarda), Cornelia Mader, and Feliciana Cramer. Before long, more young women joined them, and the sisters took up education in many church-run as well as governmental schools in Switzerland. Mother Bernarda is honored as the co-foundress of the congregation.

=== Mother Bernarda Heimgartner ===
Maria Anna Heimgartner was born in Fislisbach, Canton Aargau on November 26, 1822. Her father died when she was fourteen. After her education, she worked as a children's nurse between 1838 and 1840. Feeling called to religious life, she began studies with the canonesses in Baden. She joined the 'Sisters of Divine Providence' in Ribeauville, Alsace between 1843 and 1844.

From the village of Menzingen the congregation grew and spread mainly to the poorer central parts of Switzerland.

In July 1883 the first five Holy Cross Sisters arrived in Durban in answer to a call for missionaries in Southern Africa. They travelled by steamship from Southampton. Upon arriving they up the St John's River and continued their journey by ox wagon to Umtata, where they established their first school and a hospital.

Nine sisters travelled from Menzingen to nurse the sick in government hospitals at Trivandrum and Quilon, India.

== Locations ==
- Switzerland (1844)
- South Africa (1883)
- England (1902)
- Sri Lanka (1930)
- Belfast, Northern Ireland
- Quilon, India

== Institutions ==
=== Schools ===
- Holy Cross School, London, UK
- Holy Cross Preparatory School, London, UK
- Holy Cross Sister's School, Bellville, SA
- Holy Cross Sister's School, Maitland, SA

=== Hospitals ===
- St. Josephs Home for the Elders, Jaffna, Sri Lanka
- Holy Cross Hospital, Jaffna, Sri Lanka
- Holy Cross Super Speciality Hospital, Kollam, Kerala, India
