= Fens Primary School =

Coordinates: 54.65314°N 1.23371°W

Location
- Mowbray Road; Hartlepool, County Durham, TS25 2LY; England

Information
- Type: Community school
- Established: c. 1965
- Local authority: Hartlepool Borough Council
- Department for Education URN: 111600 Tables
- Ofsted: Reports
- Head teacher: Peter Cornforth
- Gender: Mixed
- Age: 3 to 11
- Enrolment: approx. 430
- Website: http://www.fensprimaryschool.co.uk

Fens Primary School is a mixed primary school and nursery located in the southern area of Hartlepool, County Durham, England. It is overseen by Hartlepool Local Education Authority. Around 430 children are educated in ages 3–11.

== History ==
The school was established as a separate infant and junior school in 1965. In 1985, following the amalgamation of the two schools, Fens Primary School was formed.

Fens Primary was, in May 2008, appointed to mentor and advise the failing Clavering Primary School.

== Academic standards ==
Following the March 2004 Ofsted inspection, the school was rated Very Good. The Ofsted report described "excellent leadership" at the school.

The school was placed in the top 5% in the country, in 2006, for the second year in a row.

Fens Primary was awarded the Artsmark in 2007.

The school was last inspected by Ofsted in January 2008, and was awarded an overall performance rating of Grade 1 Outstanding, point one on a four-point scale, with pupils making good progress in their academic skills and personal development from very low starting points in the nursery.

High standards continued in 2008–09 when the school scored well above both the national and local average in all measures.

== The arts ==
In an imaginative project, the school invited poet Andy Croft to spend a week with the year six children to encourage them to be creative with their thoughts about money.

== Headteacher ==
The headteacher, Peter Cornforth, was honoured by then Prime Minister Gordon Brown for exceptional school leadership. he is one of the National College for School Leadership's 'National Leaders of Education'.

== Notable alumni ==
- Lindsay Johnson, footballer who plays for the England women's national football team.
