= List of schools in the London Borough of Haringey =

This is a list of schools in the London Borough of Haringey, England.

== State-funded schools ==
=== Primary schools ===
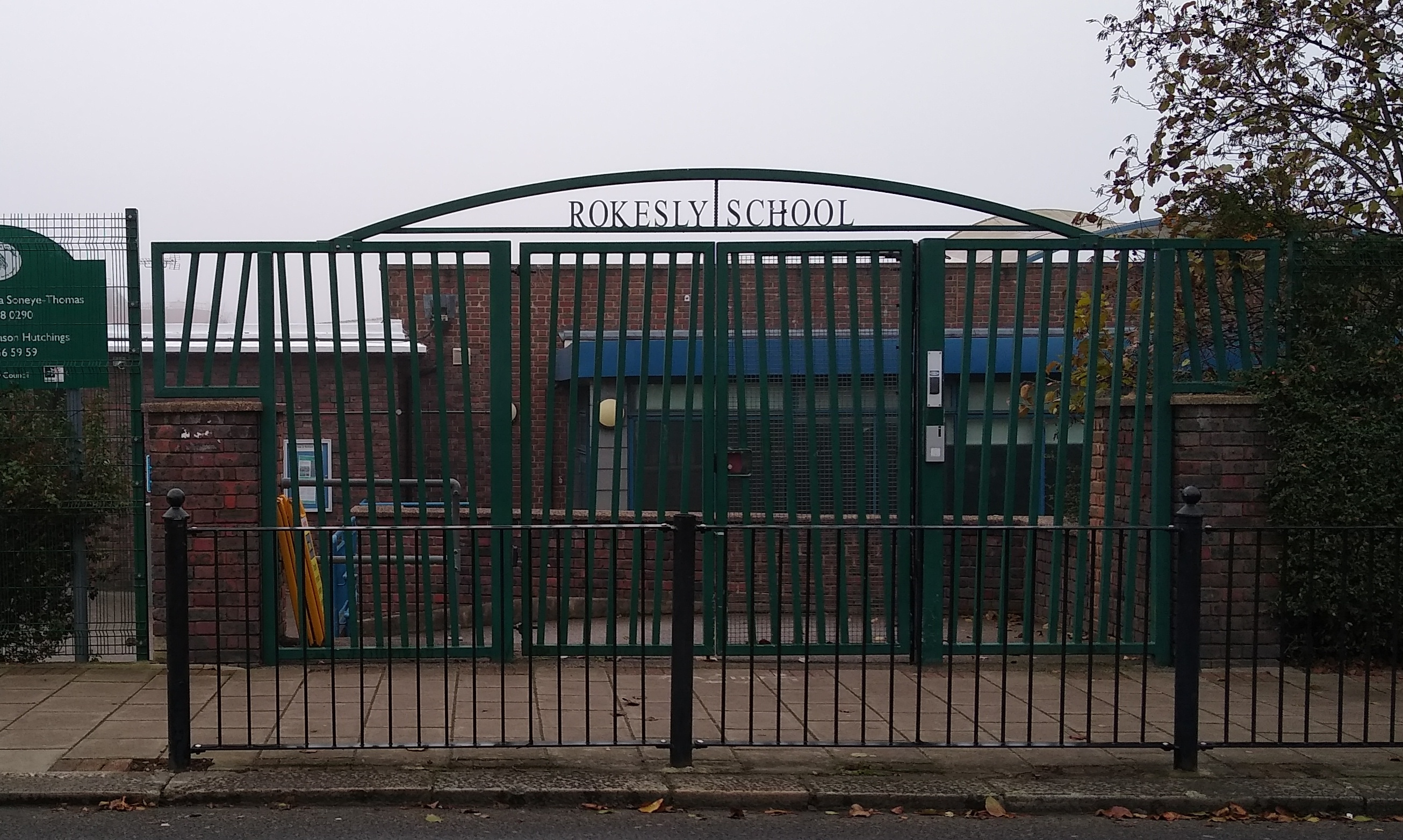
Rokesly School

- Alexandra Primary School
- Belmont Infant School
- Belmont Junior School
- Bounds Green Infant School
- Bounds Green Junior School
- Brook House Primary School
- Bruce Grove Primary School
- Campsbourne Infant School
- Campsbourne Junior School
- Chestnuts Primary School
- Coldfall Primary School
- Coleridge Primary School
- Crowland Primary School
- The Devonshire Hill Primary School
- Earlham Primary School
- Earlsmead Primary School
- Eden Primary School
- Ferry Lane Primary School
- Fortismer
- Harris Academy Tottenham
- Harris Primary Academy Coleraine Park
- Harris Primary Academy Philip Lane
- Highgate Primary School
- Holy Trinity CE Primary School
- Lancasterian Primary School
- Lea Valley Primary School
- Lordship Lane Primary School
- The Mulberry Primary School
- Muswell Hill Primary School
- Noel Park Primary School
- North Harringay Primary School
- Our Lady of Muswell RC Primary School
- Rhodes Avenue Primary School
- Risley Avenue Primary School
- Rokesly Infant School
- Rokesly Junior School
- St Aidan's Voluntary Controlled Primary School
- St Ann's CE Primary School
- St Francis de Sales RC Infant School
- St Francis de Sales RC Junior School
- St Gildas’ RC Junior School
- St Ignatius RC Primary School
- St James CE Primary School
- St John Vianney RC Primary School
- St Martin of Porres RC Primary School
- St Mary's CE Primary School
- St Mary's Priory RC Infant School
- St Mary's Priory RC Junior School
- St Michael's CE Primary School, Highgate
- St Michael's CE Primary School, Wood Green
- St Paul's and All Hallows CE Infant School
- St Paul's and All Hallows CE Junior School
- St Paul's RC Primary School
- St Peter-in-Chains RC Infant School
- Seven Sisters Primary School
- South Grove Primary School
- South Harringay Infant School
- South Harringay Junior School
- Stroud Green Primary School
- Tetherdown Primary School
- Tiverton Primary School
- Trinity Primary Academy
- Welbourne Primary School
- West Green Primary School
- Weston Park Primary School
- The Willow Primary School

=== Secondary schools ===
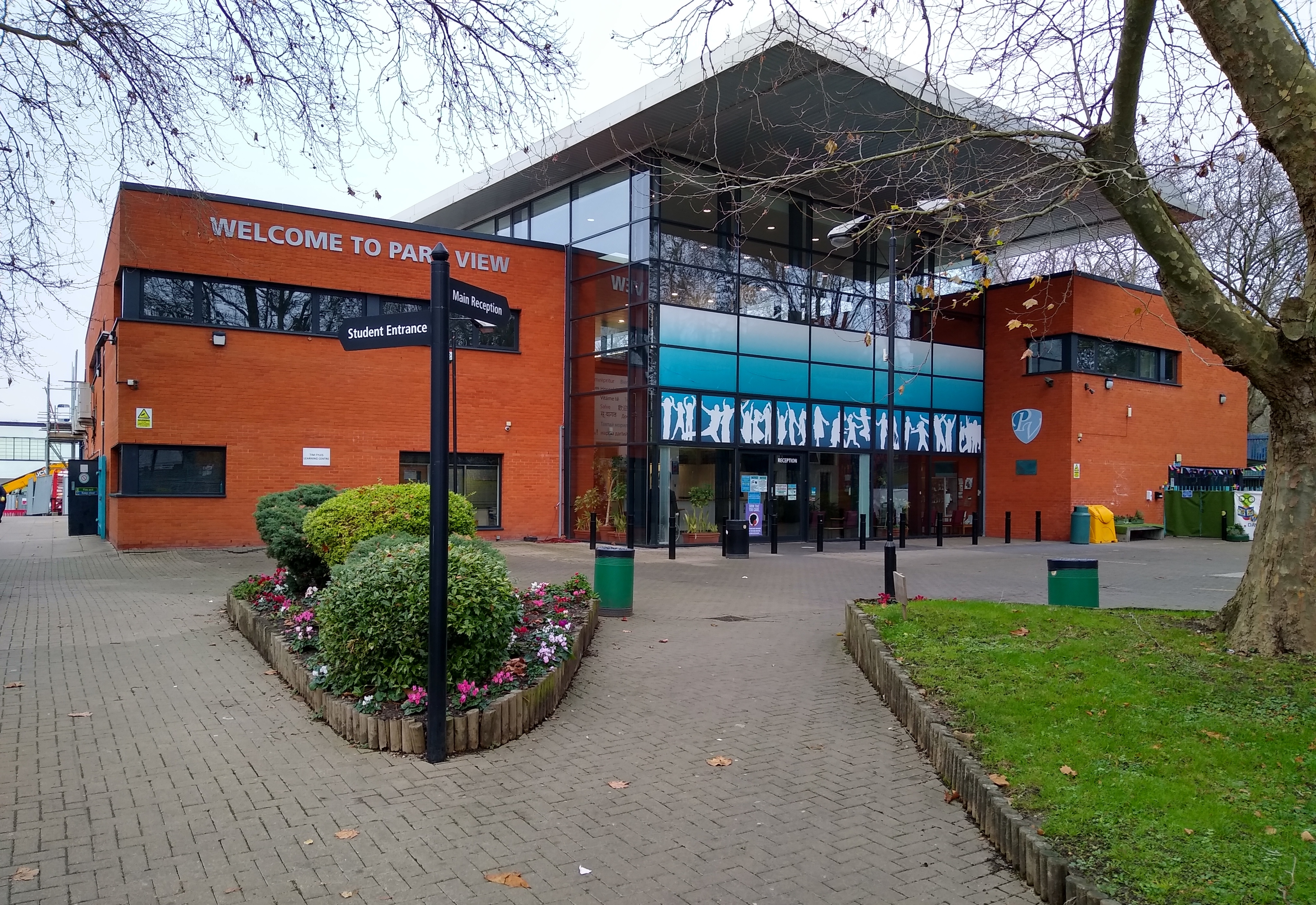
Park View School

- Alexandra Park School
- Duke's Aldridge Academy
- Fortismere School
- Gladesmore Community School
- Greig City Academy
- Harris Academy Tottenham
- Heartlands High School
- Highgate Wood Secondary School
- Hornsey School for Girls
- Mulberry Academy Woodside
- Park View School
- St Thomas More RC School

=== Special and alternative schools ===
- Blanche Nevile School
- The Brook Special Primary School
- The Grove
- Haringey Learning Partnership
- Riverside School
- Vale School

=== Further education ===
- Ada, the National College for Digital Skills
- The College of Haringey, Enfield and North East London
- Haringey Sixth Form College

== Independent schools ==
=== Primary and preparatory schools ===
- Assunnah Primary School
- The Avenue Pre-Preparatory School and Nursery
- Hyland House School
- Islamic Shakhsiyah Foundation
- Norfolk House School

=== Senior and all-through schools ===
- Channing School
- Greek Secondary School of London
- Highgate School
- North London Rudolf Steiner School

=== Special and alternative schools ===
- The Footsteps Academy
- Kestrel House School
- Odyssey House School
- TreeHouse School
- Unique Children's School
