= Richard Challoner School =

Location
- Manor Drive North; New Malden, Surrey, KT3 5PE; England; 51°23′07″N 0°15′54″W

Information
- Type: Academy
- Motto: Keep Faith
- Religious affiliation: Roman Catholic
- Established: 1959; 67 years ago
- Founder: Richard Challoner
- Department for Education URN: 137299 Tables
- Ofsted: Reports
- Chair of Governors: Francis Corrigan
- Head Teacher: Sean Maher
- Gender: Year 7–11: Boys Sixth Form: Mixed
- Age: 11 to 18
- Houses: Augustine; Becket; Columba; Dunstan; Fisher; More
- Colours: Green and Yellow
- Alumni name: Old Challonians
- School Song: Non Nobis Domine
- Diocese: Southwark
- ESFA Champions: 2010
- Website: www.richardchalloner.com

Richard Challoner School is an all boys secondary school with a mixed sixth form that is federated with Holy Cross School, New Malden. It has academy status and is in Kingston upon Thames, Surrey, England. The school is named after Bishop Richard Challoner.

== Headmasters ==
The Headmasters of the school since its founding in 1959 are:

Ordinal	Headmaster	Term start	Term end	Time in office	Notes
1	Oswald Jones	1959	1977	17–18 years	Died in 2011
2	John Gwynne	1977	1994	16–17 years	Died 9 October 2014
3	Tom Cahill	1994	2015	20–21 years	
4	Sean Maher	2015	incumbent	10–11 years	

== Arts ==
The Richard Challoner Studio Theatre was officially opened by the Hungarian Ambassador in 2008. Various productions were first performed there, including Oliver, The Government Inspector, Antigone, Robin Hood, Sherlock Holmes: And the Pearls of Death, Chaplin: The Early Years and Romeo and Juliet, and then performed, on tour, in various theatres in Hungary, such as the Kolibri Theatre in Budapest. Many of the plays are written by drama teacher Mr. Neil Zoladkiewicz, who retired at the end of the 2016–17 school year.

The school also performs musicals. The most recent was A Slice Of Saturday Night in 2017, with the previous performance of Grease Lightning having happened in partnership with Willson Academy of Performing Arts in 2016.

== Notable former pupils ==
- Jérémie Boga — footballer who plays for Chelsea
- Jimmy Glass — former footballer, goalkeeper
- Ben Hawkey — actor, HBO series Game of Thrones
- Jaden Ladega — actor, BBC soap opera EastEnders
- Charly Musonda — footballer who plays for Chelsea
- Steven Reid — former international footballer who last played for Burnley F.C.
- Archie Renaux — actor, Shadow and Bone
- Ryan Sweeney — footballer who plays for Dundee FC
