= Big Creative Academy =

Coordinates: 51.5935°N 0.0404°W

Big Creative Education

Location
- Clifton Avenue Walthamstow; London, E17 6HL; England

Information
- Type: Free school sixth form
- Established: 1 September 2014
- Local authority: Waltham Forest
- Department for Education URN: 141030 Tables
- Ofsted: Reports
- Principal: Sacha Corcoran MBE
- Gender: Mixed
- Age: 16 to 19
- Website: http://www.bigcreative.education/bca-about/

Big Creative Academy is a free school sixth form located in the Walthamstow area of the London Borough of Waltham Forest, England.

Big Creative Academy was established in 2014 and specialises in the creative industries. The academy is part of Big Creative Education which also provides creative-focused apprenticeships and training.

Big Creative Academy offers vocational sixth form courses in the creative industries at levels 1 to 3. Areas of study include Creative Media Production, Dance, Drama, Events Management, Fashion Design, Marketing, Music Practice and Music Production.
