= List of schools in Stockton-on-Tees =

This is a list of schools in the Borough of Stockton-on-Tees, England.

== State-funded schools ==
=== Primary schools ===
- Bader Primary School, Thornaby
- Barley Fields Primary School, Ingleby Barwick
- Bewley Primary School, Billingham
- Billingham South Community Primary School, Billingham
- Bowesfield Primary School, Stockton
- Christ The King RC Primary School, Thornaby
- Crooksbarn Primary School, Stockton
- Durham Lane Primary School, Eaglescliffe
- Egglescliffe CE Primary School, Egglescliffe
- Fairfield Primary School, Fairfield
- Frederick Nattrass Primary Academy, Stockton
- The Glebe Primary School, Stockton
- Hardwick Green Primary Academy, Stockton
- Harewood Primary School, Thornaby
- Harrow Gate Academy, Stockton
- Hartburn Primary School, Hartburn
- High Clarence Primary School, Port Clarence
- Holy Trinity Rosehill CE Primary School, Stockton
- Ingleby Mill Primary School, Ingleby Barwick
- Junction Farm Primary School, Eaglescliffe
- Kirklevington Primary School, Kirklevington
- Layfield Primary School, Yarm
- Levendale Primary School, Yarm
- The Links Primary School, Eaglescliffe
- Mandale Mill Primary School, Stockton
- Mill Lane Primary School, Stockton
- Myton Park Primary School, Ingleby Barwick
- Norton Primary Academy, Norton
- The Oak Tree Academy, Stockton
- Oakdene Primary School, Billingham
- Our Lady of the Most Holy Rosary RC Academy, Billingham
- Oxbridge Lane Primary School, Stockton
- Pentland Primary School, Billingham
- Preston Primary School, Eaglescliffe
- Prior's Mill CE Primary School, Billingham
- Roseberry Primary School, Billingham
- Rosebrook Primary School, Stockton
- St Bede's RC Academy, Stockton
- St Cuthbert's RC Primary School, Stockton
- St Francis of Assisi CE Primary School, Ingleby Barwick
- St Gregory's RC Academy, Stockton
- St John the Baptist CE Primary School, Stockton
- St John the Evangelist RC Primary School, Billingham
- St Joseph's RC Academy, Norton
- St Joseph's RC Primary School, Billingham
- St Mark's CE Primary School, Fairfield
- St Mary's CE Primary School, Stockton
- St Patrick's RC Primary School, Stockton
- St Patrick's RC Primary School, Thornaby
- St Paul's RC Primary School, Billingham
- St Therese of Lisieux RC Primary School, Ingleby Barwick
- Thornaby CE Primary School, Thornaby
- Tilery Primary School, Stockton
- Village Primary School, Thornaby
- Whinstone Primary School, Ingleby Barwick
- Whitehouse Primary School, Stockton
- William Cassidi CE Primary School, Stillington
- Wolviston Primary School, Billingham
- Wynyard CE Primary School, Wynyard Woods
- Yarm Primary School, Yarm

=== Secondary schools ===
- All Saints Academy, Ingleby Barwick
- Conyers' School, Yarm
- Egglescliffe School, Eaglescliffe
- The Grangefield Academy, Stockton
- Ian Ramsey Church of England Academy, Hartburn
- Ingleby Manor Free School, Thornaby
- North Shore Academy, Stockton
- Northfield School & Sports College, Billingham
- Our Lady and St Bede Catholic Academy, Stockton
- Outwood Academy Bishopsgarth, Stockton
- St Michael's Catholic Academy, Billingham
- St Patrick's Catholic College, Thornaby
- Thornaby Academy, Thornaby

=== Special and alternative schools ===
- Abbey Hill Academy, Stockton
- Ash Trees Academy, Billingham
- Bishopton PRU, Billingham
- Green Gates Academy, Stockton
- Westlands Academy, Thornaby

=== Further education ===
- Stockton Riverside College, Thornaby
- Stockton Sixth Form College, Stockton

== Independent schools ==
=== Senior and all-through schools ===
- Red House School, Norton
- Teesside High School, Eaglescliffe
- Yarm School, Yarm

=== Special and alternative schools ===
- Elmbank Learning Centre, Stockton
- Hartwell School, Stockton
- King Edwin School, Stockton
- Kiora Hall, Norton
