= Tresham College of Further and Higher Education =

Location
- Windmill Avenue; Kettering, Northamptonshire, NN15 6ER; England; 52°23′20″N 0°42′39″W

Information
- Type: Public FE
- Opened: 1978
- Local authority: East Midlands LSC (although situated in Northamptonshire LEA)
- Department for Education URN: 130771 Tables
- Ofsted: Reports
- Principal and Chief Executive: Ian Pryce
- Gender: Mixed
- Age: 16+
- Enrolment: 3000 (13,000 part-time)
- Sites: Corby, Wellingborough, Kettering & Silverstone Circuit
- Affiliations: De Montfort University, Thames Valley University, University of Bedfordshire and University of Northampton
- Website: http://www.tresham.ac.uk

Tresham College of Further and Higher Education (formerly Tresham Institute of Further and Higher Education) is a number of further education colleges in the East Midlands of England. Specifically located within Northamptonshire, the main campus is located within the town of Kettering, alongside other campuses included within Corby and Wellingborough. Bedford College and Tresham College merged in 2017 to form the Bedford College Group.

== Admissions ==
The college headquarters are on the former site of Kettering Grammar School, which originally opened around 1965 on that site. The former buildings were demolished in 2007.

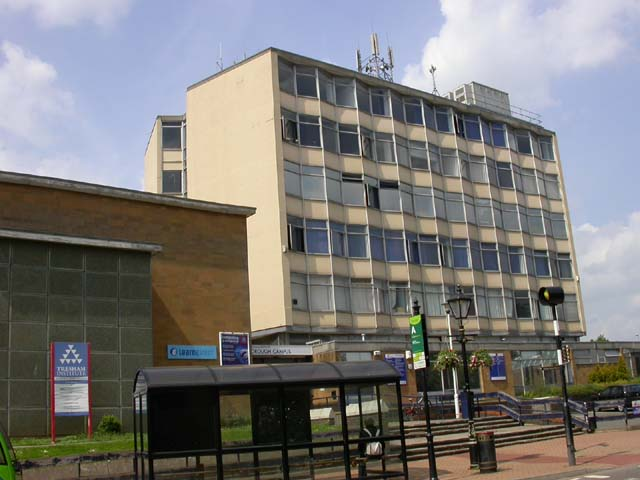
Tresham Institute's Wellingborough Campus, which is currently going through refurbishment.

It has three main campus locations, all located within the county of Northamptonshire, in:

- Kettering
- Wellingborough
- Corby

=== Partnerships ===
The Tresham College Silverstone Centre, based at Silverstone motor racing circuit, is Britain's National College for Motorsport and is classed as a centre of excellence. The college is also a lead academic sponsor of Silverstone University Technical College which opened at the circuit in September 2013.

Tresham College has also been a delivery partner for the Prince's Trust Team programme since 1999 and in September 2009 have begun to deliver the Prince's Trust XL programme to 14- to 16-year-olds.

Tresham College is partnered with De Montfort University, Thames Valley University, University of Bedfordshire and University of Northampton.

== History ==
The college opened in 1978 when Kettering and Corby further education colleges merged. When Wellingborough College merged on 1 April 1992, the college became Tresham Institute of Further and Higher Education.

It took over the site of Kettering Boys' School in 1993, which became its headquarters in September 1994. The college is named after the Northamptonshire dynasty and lineage of Tresham. Rutland College merged with Tresham Institute in 2000. On 8 July 2009 'Tresham Institute' became 'Tresham College of Further and Higher Education'.

=== Redevelopment ===
The Corby campus re-opened with an entirely new building on a different site in September 2011. The Kettering campus has improved security to match the Corby campus and further extensions are planned. The Wellingborough Campus also has significant plans for redevelopment.

The redevelopment resulted in the demolition of the Kettering Boys' School building, which featured a 1962 mural, the Kettering Abstract, by Kenneth Budd. The mural was removed to safekeeping at the behest of the Kettering Civic Society. The remade mosaic is displayed in the Alfred East Gallery in Kettering but the gallery is closed to the public during renovations.

=== Former schools ===
As well as Kettering Grammar School, whose site was seconded in 1993, the former Corby Community College in Corby was taken over in 2009. This school had originated as Corby Grammar School, a grammar school on Oakley Road which became the comprehensive Southwood School in 1973, then the Queen Elizabeth School in 1982. John Sutton CBE was headmaster of these schools from 1973-88. He later became General Secretary from 1988-98 of the Secondary Heads Association (became the Association of School and College Leaders in 2006). John Kempe was headmaster of Corby Grammar School from 1955–67; he was later headmaster of Gordonstoun from 1968-78. Colin Dexter, the author, taught Classics at Corby Grammar School from 1959-66. As well as Corby Grammar School, there was Kingswood Grammar School in the town (now The Kingswood School), which opened in 1965.

=== Notable alumni (Corby Grammar School) ===
- Jill McGown, writer of detective fiction
- Andrew Pettigrew, sociologist and academic
