= Holy Cross Preparatory School =

Location
- George Road; Kingston upon Thames, London, KT2 7NU; England; 51.41868°N 0.27347°W

Information
- Type: Preparatory day school
- Motto: In cruce salus ("Salvation comes from the cross")
- Religious affiliation: Roman Catholic
- Established: 1931
- Local authority: Kingston upon Thames
- Chair of Trustees: Sister Margaret Donovan
- Head teacher: Sarah Hair
- Gender: Girls
- Age: 3 to 11
- Enrolment: 295~
- Colour
- Website: www.holycrossprepschool.co.uk

Holy Cross Preparatory School is an independent preparatory school for girls aged 4–11 in Coombe, London, England.

== History ==
Holy Cross Preparatory School was founded by the Sisters of the Holy Cross Menzingen, an international teaching order which has been engaged in the work of education since 1844. A Christian ethos is taught in an ecumenical framework.

Holy Cross Prep was originally the junior department of Holy Cross School in New Malden. It moved out to its new premises in 1971 to form what is now Holy Cross Preparatory School.

== Buildings ==
The school is located on George Road in Coombe, a historical estate dating back to the 13th century which was previously owned by the Crown. In 1215 King John gave the estate to Hugh de Nevill, former High Sheriff of Essex.

The school occupies a Victorian-era mansion, lodge and grounds once known as Coombe Leigh, and later Coombe Ridge House. Constructed and owned by the author John Galsworthy, it was completed in 1874. Galsworthy and his family lived there until 1884. In the grounds of the school is the ancient monument "The Ivy Conduit", part of an elaborate water system built in 1516 to supply Cardinal Wolsey's newly built Hampton Court Palace. The Conduit House fell into disrepair after being damaged by a German V1 bomb in June 1944. The school successfully applied for a grant from English Heritage and the house has since been restored. The Ivy Conduit has been designated a Grade II listed building.

== House system ==
There are four houses and each house is led by a House Captain (usually a Year 6 pupil) and Vice-Captain.

- St. Dominic
- St. Teresa
- St. Elizabeth
- St. Francis

== Awards and recognition ==
Holy Cross was named "Independent Preparatory School of the Year" in 2013 by The Sunday Times
