= Harington School =

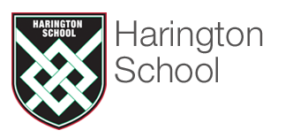

Location
- Huntsmans Drive; Oakham; Rutland, LE15 6RP; England; 52.6724°N 0.7376°W

Information
- Type: Free school sixth form
- Established: 1 September 2015
- Department for Education URN: 141965 Tables
- Ofsted: Reports
- Head of School: Oliver Teasel
- Gender: Mixed
- Age: 16 to 19
- Website: http://www.haringtonschool.com/

Harington School is a free school sixth form located in Oakham, Rutland. The school is named after John Harington, 1st Baron Harington of Exton and John Harington, 2nd Baron Harington of Exton, two notable peers in Rutland in the late sixteenth and early seventeenth centuries.

Established in September 2015, Harington School is governed by the Rutland and District Schools' Federation, which comprises Harington School, Catmose College and Catmose Primary School. Harington School has its own dedicated building located next to Catmose College.

Since 2022, the head of school has been Oliver Teasel.

== Overview ==
=== Curriculum ===
Harington School offers a full-time A-level programme where each student receives five hours and ten minutes of lessons per subject per week, as well as sessions on personal development, academic enrichment, and physical, musical, or cultural activities. Students are given personal study sessions, with the ability to study in communal areas, quiet study rooms or unused classrooms.

The school promotes work experience as part of its curriculum, which includes a variety of work-related activities such as volunteering at nearby care homes, running a student-led business with Young Enterprise, and placements with external employers. Furthermore, students are given the opportunity to run a racing team and design, build and race an electric vehicle as part of the Greenpower Challenge.

Harington also offers students extracurricular opportunities including Young Enterprise, Green Power, and DocSoc (run along with nearby Oakham School).

The Duke of Edinburgh award is also offered by the school.

=== Academic Achievement ===
Students take either three or four A-level subjects. In 2024, the school performed well, with 31.4% of students scoring A*-A for their A-level examinations, above the national average of 27.8%. The average point score for 2024 was 39.07, higher than the national average of 38.2.

=== Inspection ===
Ofsted inspected Harington School in January 2017 and rated it "Outstanding." The report highlighted the school's high expectations for student achievement, strong leadership, and the effective monitoring of student progress.

According to a review by The Good Schools Guide, Harington is known for its academic, with highly motivated students and benefiting from the many enrichment activities. The leadership team has worked to create a culture of excellence, with teachers offering detailed feedback and students taking responsibility for their learning.

=== Facilities ===
Harington School has subject-specific classrooms named after well-known British universities. Assemblies and speeches are held in the "Heart Space" atrium. The school features communal study areas with computers, along with a private study room with individual booths and access to material such as dictionaries, textbooks and subject specifications. Outdoor spaces offer activities including pool, table tennis, and table football. The school shares its cafeteria with the neighbouring Catmose College, however has its own dining area called "The Orangery". Students also have access to the Catmose Sports Centre.
