= Bernarda Heimgartner =

Swiss religious sister and founder

Venerable Bernarda Heimgartner
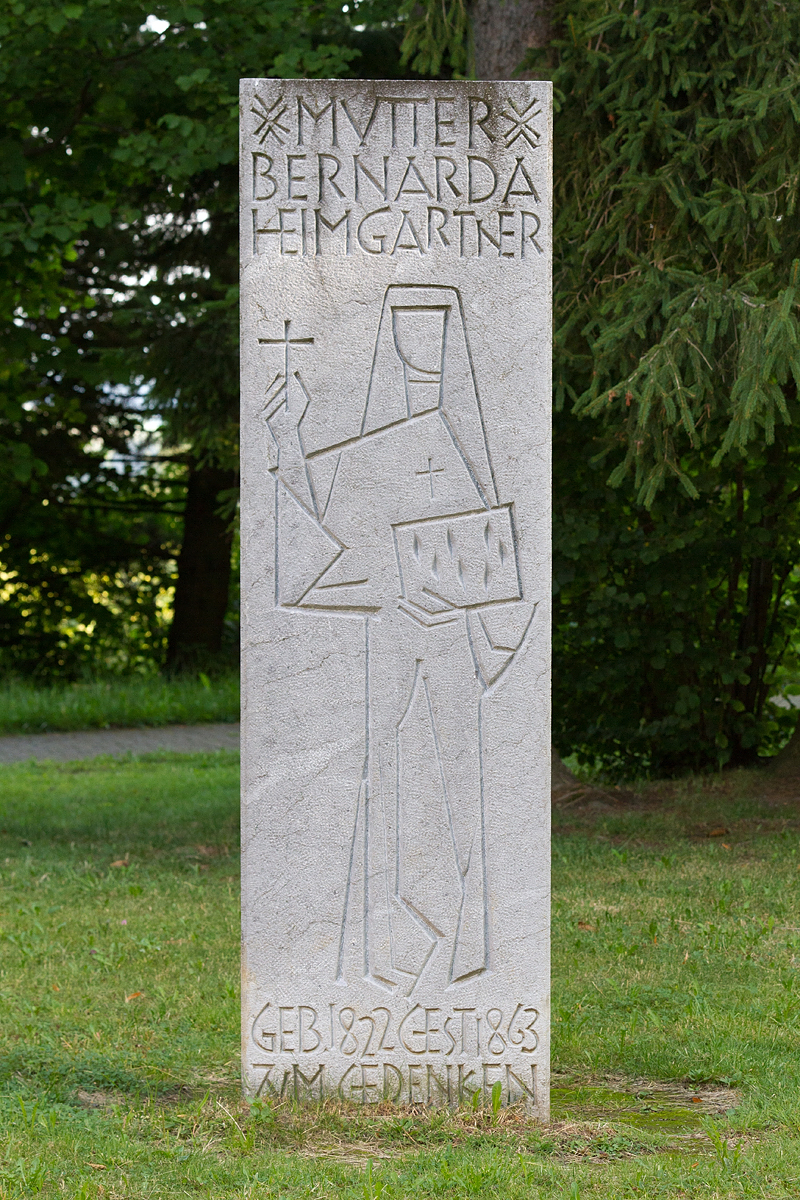
- Memorial for Mother Bernarda
- Born: 26 November 1822; Fislisbach, Aargau, Switzerland
- Died: 13 December 1863 (aged 41); Menzingen, Zug, Switzerland

Bernarda Heimgartner (born Maria Anna Heimgartner, 26 November 1822 – 13 December 1863) was a Swiss religious sister and the co-founder of the Sisters of the Holy Cross Menzingen. Heimgartner founded this order alongside Theodosius Florentini OFMCap in 1844 and served as its mother superior until three months before her death. She had become a member of the Sisters of Divine Providence in 1843 and made her vows in 1844 before establishing a new congregation.

Heimgartner's beatification process commenced in 1952 under Pope Pius XII. Pope John Paul II confirmed Heimgartner had lived a life of heroic virtue and named her as venerable on 26 March 1994.

== Life ==
Maria Anna Heimgartner was born on 26 November 1822 in Switzerland as the fourth of six children of Heimrich Josef Heimgartner (1788–1836) and Anna Maria Trüb. Her father died in 1836 when she was fourteen and this forced her to assume greater home duties. Her maternal uncle served as a parish priest.

Her initial education spanned from 1829 until 1837 in Fislisbach and then served as a nurse for children in Baden from 1838 until 1840. In 1840 – on the advice of her confessor Theodosius Florentini – she received training as a teacher from Capuchin nuns.

Heimgartner studied from 1841 until 1844 with the Ursulines in the German city of Freiburg in the Breisgau region. She entered the novitiate of the Sisters of Divine Providence in 1843 and received the religious name Bernarda. Heimgartner made her vows on 16 October 1844 in Altdorf, while relocating on 17 October 1844 to Menzingen.

Heimgartner and Florentini – with three others – established the congregation of the Sisters of the Holy Cross Menzingen in October 1844 but conflicts with Florentini from 1854 to 1856 saw the separation of the two congregations he co-founded: one in Ingenbohl and one in Menzingen.

Heimgartner's time as Mother superior witnessed the establishment of a total of 59 homes and schools. She would often mention that "our fountain of life is Divine providence". In 1859 she was diagnosed with pulmonary tuberculosis. She relinquished the office as Mother superior on 21 September 1863.

Heimgartner died due tuberculosis on 13 December 1863. The congregation of the Sisters of the Holy Cross Menzingen was later aggregated to the Third Order of Saint Francis. As of 2005 there were 2132 religious sisters in 244 houses while there were 138 German sisters in 2013.

== Beatification process ==
The beatification process commenced in two cities: Basel and Lugano. It started under Pope Pius XII in 1952. The Congregation for the Causes of Saints validated the diocesan process on 18 June 1993. Heimgartner was named venerable on 26 March 1994 after Pope John Paul II recognized that she had lived a life of heroic virtue.
