= Holy Cross School, New Malden =

Holy Cross school

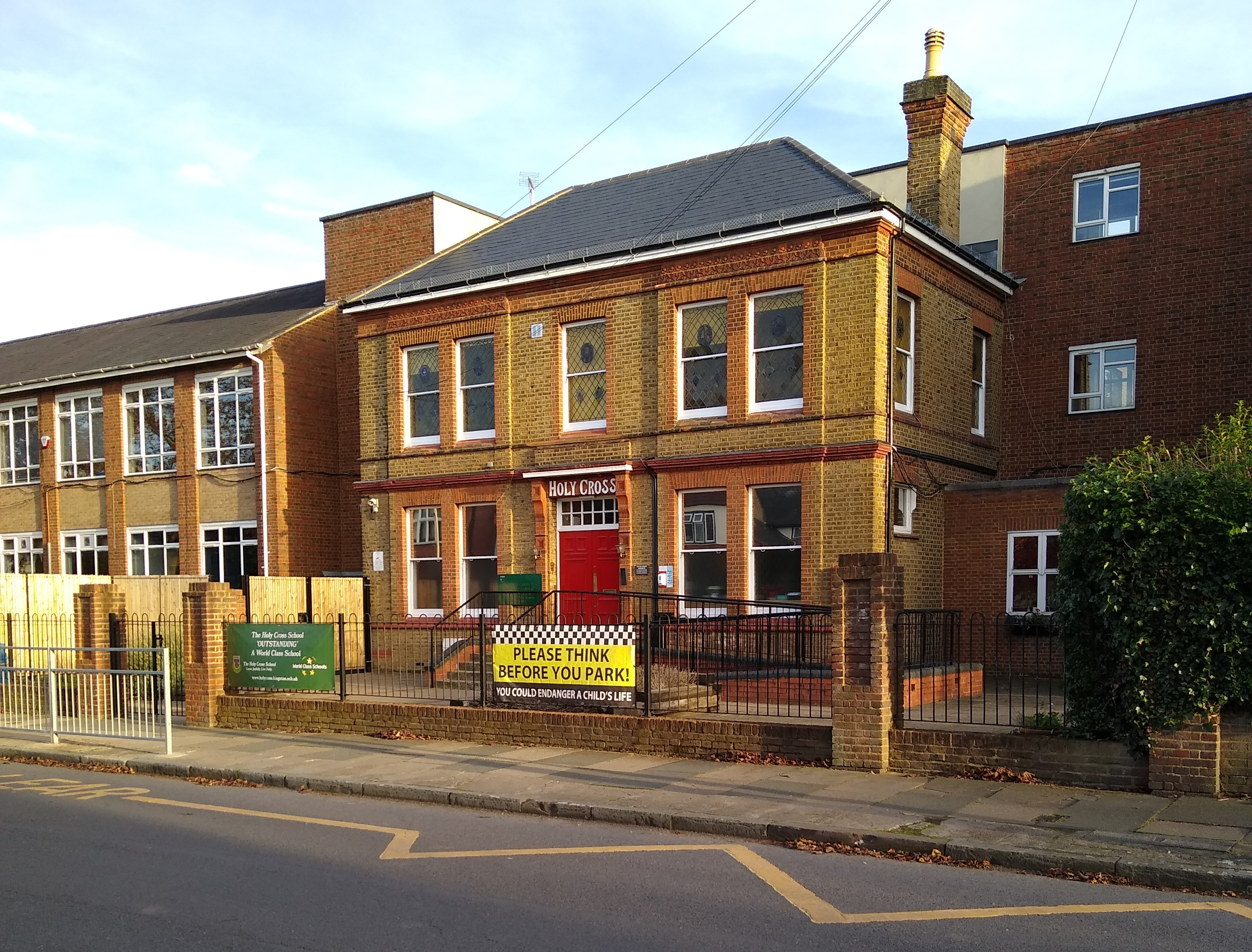

Location
- 25 Sandal Road; New Malden, London, KT3 5AR; England; 51.3979°N 0.2616°W

Information
- Type: Academy
- Motto: O crux ave spes unica ("O hail the cross our only hope")
- Religious affiliation: Roman Catholic
- Established: 23 September 1931; 94 years ago
- Department for Education URN: 138459 Tables
- Ofsted: Reports
- Chair of Governors: Piers North
- Head teacher: D. McConn-Finch
- Gender: Girls
- Age: 11 to 18
- Enrolment: 940~
- Website: http://www.holycross.kingston.sch.uk/

The Holy Cross School is a Roman Catholic secondary school with academy status for girls located in New Malden, in the Royal Borough of Kingston upon Thames, England. The school specialises in science, and converted to academy status on 1 August 2012. Its most recent Progress 8 score of +1.1 places it in the top 1% of schools in England for progress from KS2 - 4.

Most Year 11 girls apply to the sixth form. Working in partnership with its local Catholic boys school Richard Challoner, it operates a coeducational sixth form which is also open to applicants from other schools. The school has just under 1000 pupils attending in total.

== History ==
Holy Cross School was founded in 1931 by the Sisters of the Holy Cross Menzingen. The Sisters arrived in England from Switzerland during the early 1900s and set up a convent at Wimbledon (now in the London Borough of Merton). They bought a house along Sandal Road called "Southesk" - over the building's front door was a Latin inscription which read "This is the house that John built" - from Mr John Austine to use as a new school. On 23 September 1931, Sr Christina and two other Sisters opened the Holy Cross Convent School with 5 pupils. The junior department was split into a separate school and moved to new premises in 1971; it is now a private school Holy Cross Preparatory School. Over the years, the school has continuously grown and buildings added, renovated and refurbished. The original house front remains and is the current school's main entrance. The school is no longer directly under the Sisters and now mainly staffed by lay teachers but is under the order's trusteeship.

== Academic standards ==
Following their October 2007 inspection, Ofsted rated the school as Outstanding, the highest possible rating. The sixth form was assessed as Good, which is point two on the four point scale. The report said "This is an outstanding school. ... The high level of achievement and outstanding quality of care of students are a direct result of excellent leadership and management."

== School organisation ==
The average school day consists of 5 lessons, each lasting 1 hour. Each year group is split into five tutor groups. Each tutor group has a form tutor who will stay with their class throughout that year, this changes every year but the pupils within each form stay the same. All pupils wear a school uniform except the sixth form, who have a smart work dress code. However, from Year 10 certain uniform exceptions are allowed.

=== House system ===
All students are allocated a house when they begin at Holy Cross. This provides opportunity for healthy competition through gaining house points for their particular house, house events and assemblies, building relationships across year groups and creating projects and raising money for charity as a house group. A student's house identity is displayed by a coloured ribbon sewn above The Holy Cross crest on the school blazer.

Each house, with its own individual colour, is named after a Christian value put forward by the stude

House	Colour	Saint
Charity House	Purple	St Therese of Lisieux
Faith House	Blue	St Joan of Arc
Hope House	Yellow	Hildegard of Bingen
Mercy House	Red	Faustina Kowalska
Peace House	Green	Rita of Cascia

== Media coverage ==
The school has received attention for its educational programs, including a project to share music and drama concepts with Ikeda Junior High School in Osaka, Japan, and a link-up with NASA scientists in Cleveland, Ohio. In 1999 the school was the subject of press coverage when National Health Service leaflets were distributed to pupils despite containing information about contraception, contrary to Catholic teaching.

== Alumni ==
- Maryetta Midgley (b. 1942) - classical singer
- Siobhain McDonagh (b. 1960) - Labour Party politician, Member of Parliament (MP) for Mitcham and Morden (1997- )
