= Willowfield School =

Location
- 209 Blackhorse Road; Walthamstow, London, Greater London, E17 6ND; England
- Coordinates: 51.5862°N 0.0401°W

Information
- Type: Community school
- Motto: Give all thou canst
- Established: 1903
- Status: Open
- Local authority: Waltham Forest
- Department for Education URN: 103100 Tables
- Ofsted: Reports
- Chair: Liz Rutherfoord
- Headteacher: Rebecca Linden
- Gender: mixed
- Age: 11 to 16
- Enrolment: 871
- Average class size: 28
- Colours: Blue, Gold, Black
- Rival: Walthamstow Academy
- Publication: Willowfield's World
- Website: http://www.willowfield-school.co.uk

Willowfield School is a mixed gender secondary school in Walthamstow, East London with 1050 students on roll. It admits 210 students to Year 7 each year. The previous headteacher was Clive Rosewell, who succeeded John Hemingway in April 2016. Clive Rosewell has been since succeeded by Rebecca Linden in September 2023. The school moved to a purpose-built site in 2015.

== Awards ==
- A Holder of the ArtsMark Silver Award – for the quality of the opportunities offered in music, drama, art and dance.
- A Holder of the Healthy Schools Award – for the work done to encourage students to adopt healthy lifestyles.
