= Catmose College =

Coordinates: 52°40′25.58″N 0°44′30.57″W

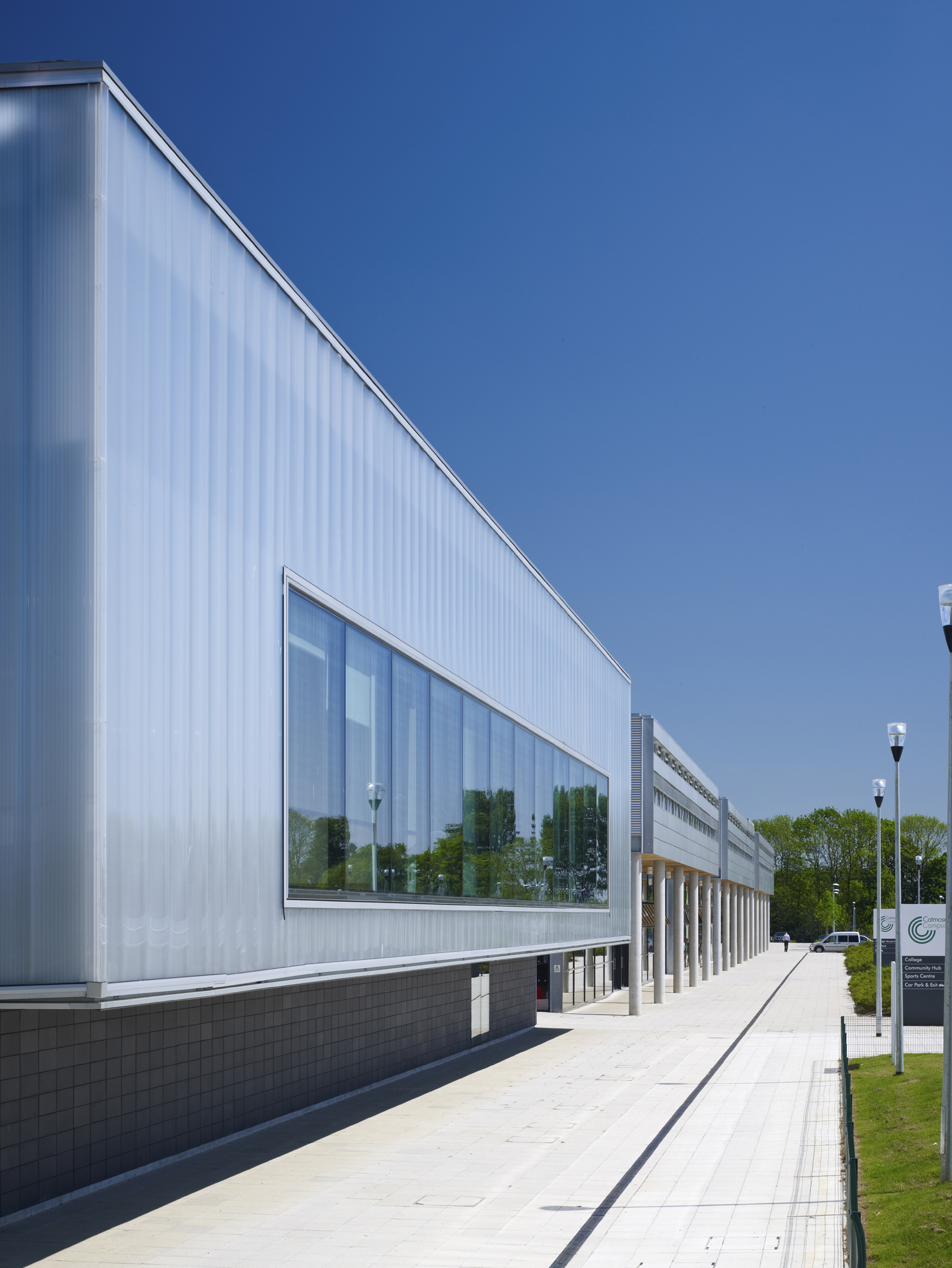
- Catmose College, Oakham, main building

Location
- Huntsmans Drive; Oakham, Rutland, LE15 6RP; England

Information
- Type: Academy
- Motto: Equal Value, Outstanding Progress
- Established: 1920
- Department for Education URN: 136530 Tables
- Ofsted: Reports
- Principal: Stuart Williams
- Age: 11 to 16
- Colour: green
- Website: www.catmosecollege.com

Catmose College is a secondary academy school on Huntsmans Drive in Oakham, Rutland. The catchment area covers the county town of Oakham and surrounding villages, although students are drawn from a wider area through parental choice.

Originally Oakham Central School, the school went through a number of name changes. From 1972 until 2009 the school name was Vale of Catmose College. Moving to a new campus in 2011, it was renamed Catmose College.

== History ==
=== Timeline 1920–2009 ===
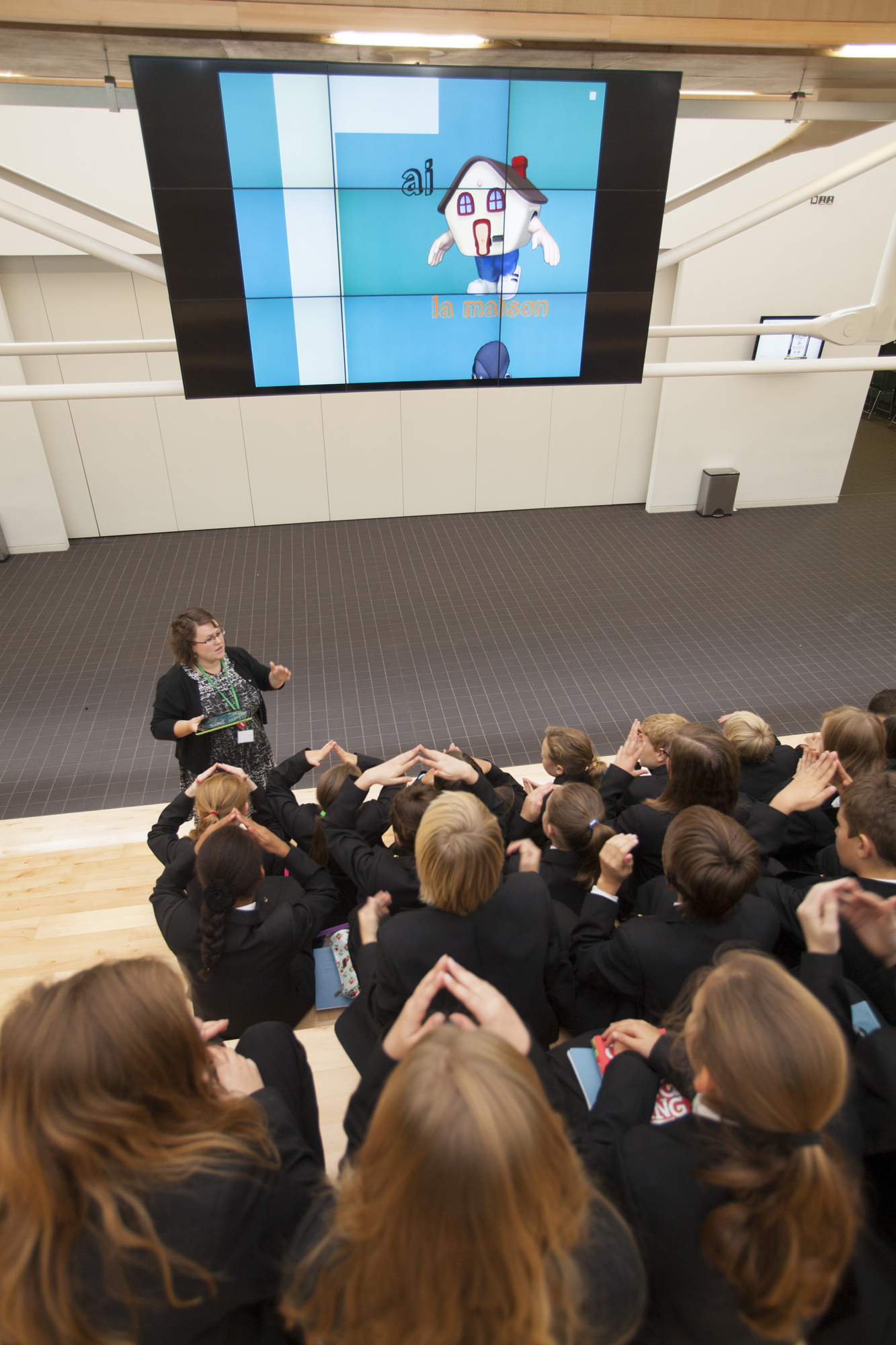
Catmose College students learning French on the Hellerup

- 1920 – Oakham Central School
- 1937 – Secondary Modern School
- 1946 – Oakham County Secondary School
- 1962 – Vale of Catmose Village College
- 1968 – New classroom block erected
- 1972 – Vale of Catmose College
- 2003 – Art gallery
- 2006 – Announcement of rebuild as part of Government's Building Schools for the Future programme
- 2007 – Swimming pool refurbished

=== Catmose College (since 2009) ===
Catmose College video tour produced by students

In 2009, the college in partnership with Rutland County Council started construction of a £23m new campus, which opened in 2011. The new building, designed by Jonathan Ellis Miller, combines a 900-pupil academy, Sure Start centre, sports building, outdoor pitches, and a learning disability resource centre.

In 2010 Southfield Community Primary School entered a federation with Catmose College and changed its name to Catmose Primary.

In 2011 the school moved to the new campus and became an academy. Catmose Nursery was added in 2012.

In 2012 the school was graded as "Outstanding" by Ofsted in all four categories and overall.

In September 2015 Harington School opened at the Catmose College campus. Harington School is a sixth form provision offering A-level courses for students from the whole of Rutland. It relocated to a new dedicated building next to Catmose College in October 2016.

Since at least 2015 the school has been a licensed partner organisation of the Duke of Edinburgh's Award. In recent years there has been an emphasis on extracurriculars at the school; ceramics, French, chess, and astronomy are some of the free programmes offered.

== Facilities ==
The Catmose Sports Centre includes a gym, 2 dance studios, 8 court sports hall, floodlit synthetic pitch, netball & tennis courts and coffee house plus the existing 25-metre swimming pool which was refurbished in 2007. There is also the Catmose Gallery and the Catmose Theatre.

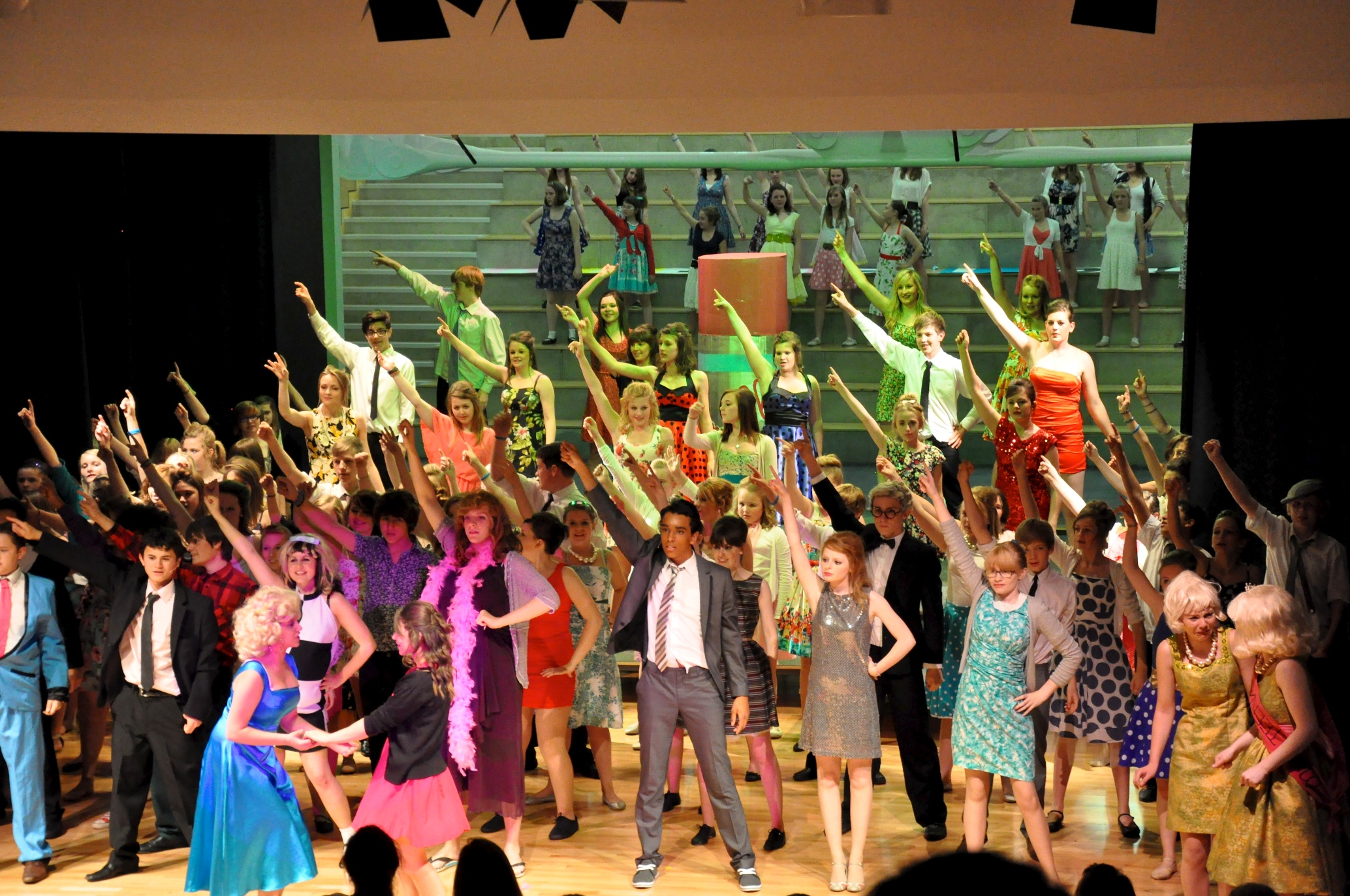
Catmose College students perform Hairspray

The college theatre is equipped with professional grade sound, light and AV equipment. It is used for presentations, assemblies and College productions. Recent productions have included Hairspray the musical and Alice in Wonderland.

== Sports ==
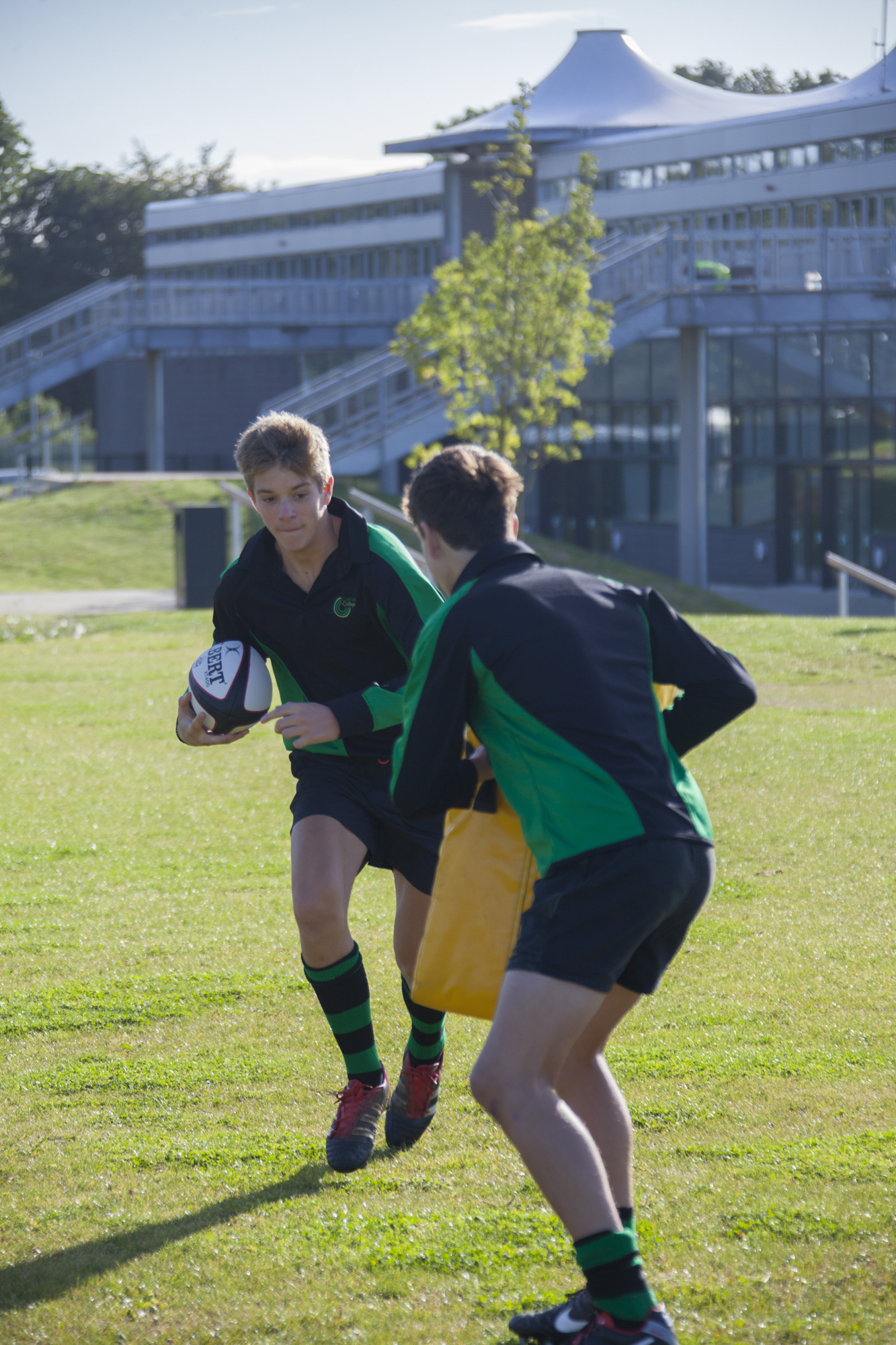
Catmose College students practising rugby drills

Sport at Catmose is integrated within the college's core curriculum, as an examination subject, and as a key component of the extracurricular opportunities available. Each student participates in two physical education lessons per week, and has the opportunity to study GCSE PE or BTEC Sport in years 10 and 11.

== The arts ==
=== Visual arts ===
Catmose College specialises in visual arts. The Catmose Gallery, opened in May 2003 by the Department for Culture, Media and Sport, was the first public art gallery located in a community college. The gallery provided students and the public with a programme of high calibre national, local and student exhibitions before in July 2011 the college governors decided on the closure of the gallery to the public.

=== Music ===
Student participation in the extra-curricular programme is around a hundred students. Available activities include a Chamber Choir for higher-ability students, a Samba Band, a classical guitar group, and a recorder club.

These groups perform for the college and wider community throughout the year. Highlights include recitals and a joint concert in the museum with students from Uppingham Community College and Oakham School.

== Notable alumni ==
- Elizabeth Berridge, Baroness Berridge, politician
- Sam Carter, musician
- Tom Marshall, artist
- Nina Sosanya, actress
