= Apple Store =

American retail store chain

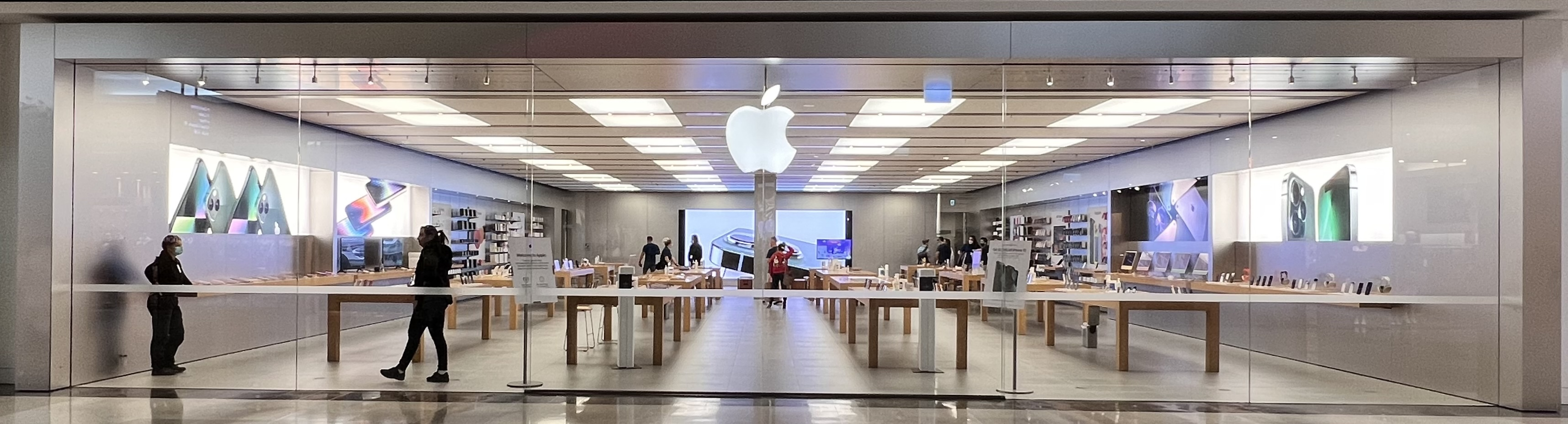
- Apple Store in Brisbane, Australia
- Type: Division
- Industry: Retail
- Founded: May 19, 2001; 25 years ago in Tysons, Virginia, US
- Founder: Steve Jobs; Ron Johnson
- Headquarters: Apple Park, Cupertino, California, US
- Number of locations: 537 (269 US; 268 overseas)
- Key people: John Ternus (CEO); Deirdre O'Brien (SVP, retail)
- Parent: Apple
- Website: apple.com/retail

The Apple Store is a chain of retail stores owned and operated by Apple. The stores sell, service and repair various Apple products, including Mac desktop and MacBook laptop personal computers, iPhone smartphones, iPad tablet computers, Apple Watch smartwatches, Apple TV digital media players, software, and both Apple-branded and selected third-party accessories.

The first Apple Stores were originally opened as two locations in May 2001 by then-CEO Steve Jobs, after years of attempting but failing store-within-a-store concepts. Seeing a need for improved retail presentation of the company's products, he began an effort in 1997 to revamp the retail program to get an improved relationship with consumers and hired Ron Johnson in 2000. Jobs relaunched Apple's online store in 1997 and opened the first two physical stores in 2001. The media initially speculated that Apple would fail, but its stores were highly successful, bypassing the sales numbers of competing nearby stores and within three years reached US$1 billion in annual sales, becoming the fastest retailer in history to do so. Apple has expanded the number of retail locations and its geographical coverage over the years, with 540 stores across 27 countries and regions worldwide. Strong product sales have placed Apple among the top-tier retail stores, with sales over $16 billion globally in 2011.

Many Apple Stores are located inside shopping malls, but Apple has built several stand-alone "flagship" stores in high-profile locations. It has been granted design patents and received architectural awards for its stores' designs and construction, specifically for its use of glass staircases and cubes. The success of Apple Stores has had significant influence over other consumer electronics retailers, who have lost traffic, control and profits due to perceived higher quality of service and products at Apple Stores. Apple's notable brand loyalty among consumers causes long lines of hundreds of people at new Apple Store openings or product releases. Due to the popularity of the brand, Apple receives many job applications, many of which come from young workers. Apple Store employees receive above-average pay, are offered money toward education and health care, and receive product discounts. A May 2016 report with an anonymous retail employee highlighted a hostile work environment with harassment from customers, intense internal criticism, and a lack of significant bonuses for securing major business contracts.

== Overview ==
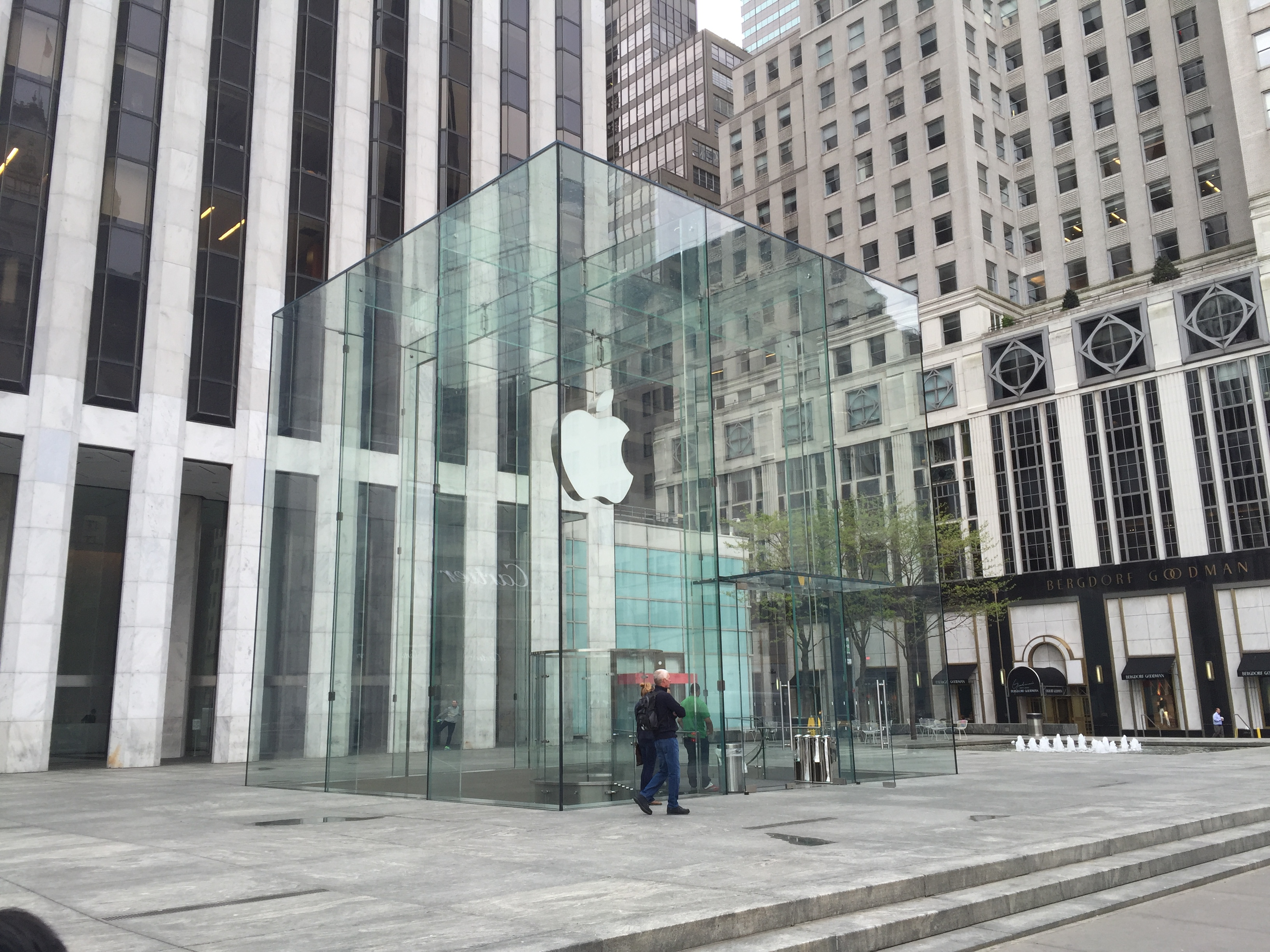
Apple Fifth Avenue in New York City

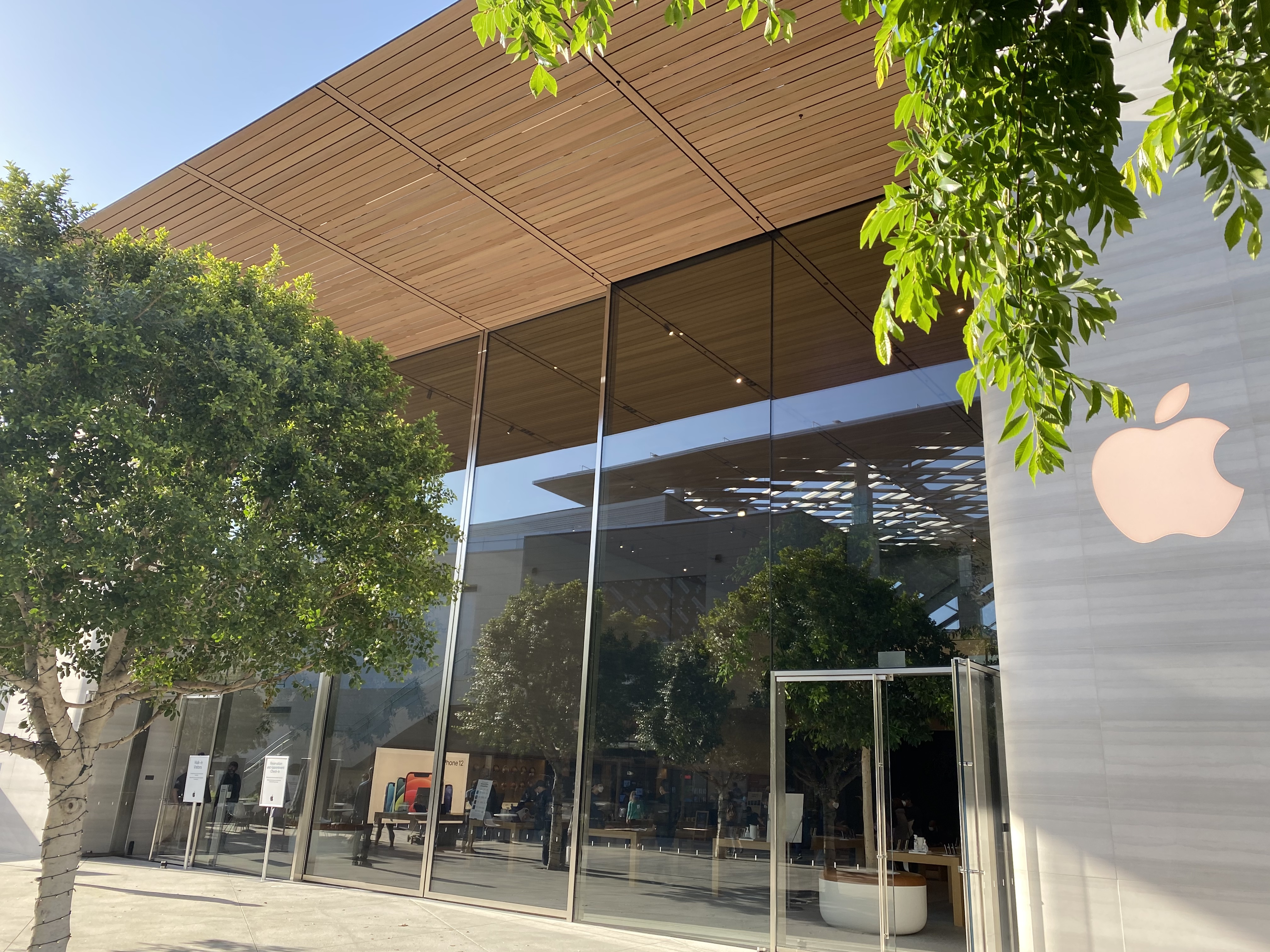
Apple's store at Westfield Valley Fair in San Jose, California

Many Apple Stores are located inside shopping malls, but Apple has several stand-alone flagship stores in high-profile locations, such as the one located in Grand Central Terminal in New York City. Several multi-level stores feature glass staircases, and some also glass bridges. The New York Times wrote in 2011 that these features were part of then-CEO Steve Jobs' extensive attention to detail, and Apple received a design patent in 2002 for its glass staircase design. Historically, Apple has partnered with architectural firm Bohlin Cywinski Jackson in designing and creating its original retail stores, and has in recent years partnered with architectural firm Foster + Partners in designing its newer stores, as well as its corporate Apple Park campus.

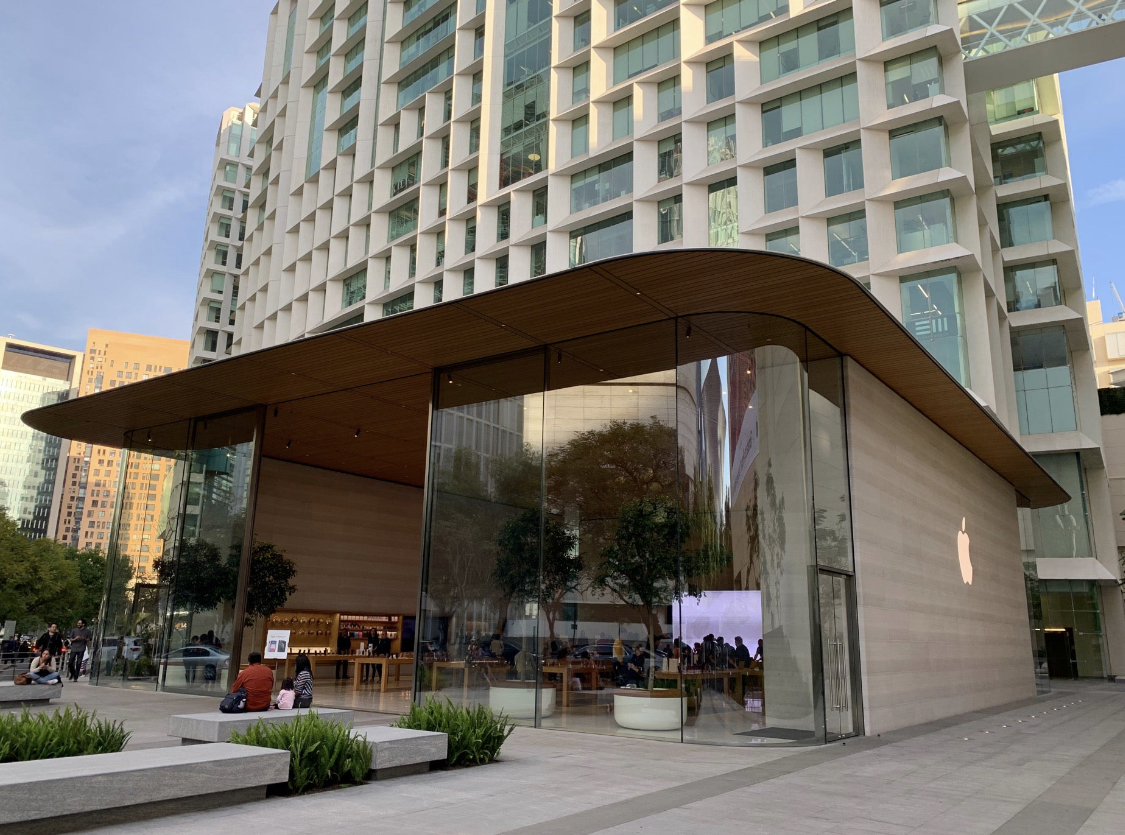
Apple store in Mexico City

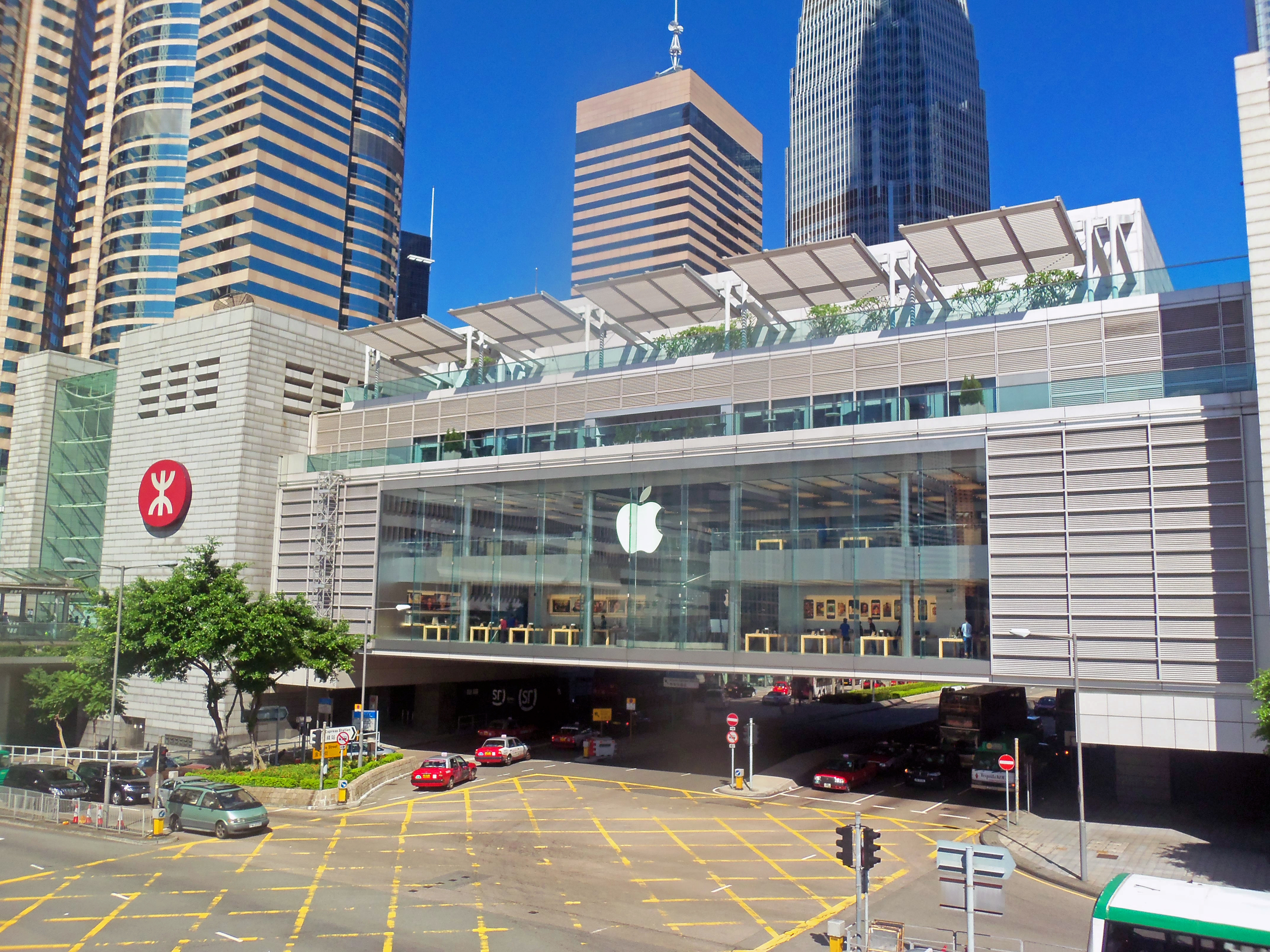
Apple store in Central, Hong Kong

Apple has received numerous architectural awards for its store designs, and its "iconic" glass cube, designed in part by Peter Bohlin, at Apple's Fifth Avenue store in New York City, received a separate design patent in 2014.

Ron Johnson held the position of Senior Vice President of Retail Operations from 2001 until November 1, 2011. During his tenure, it was reported that while Johnson was responsible for site selection, in-store service, and store layout, inventory was controlled by then-COO and now-CEO Tim Cook, who has a background in supply chain management. In January 2012, Apple transferred retail leadership to John Browett. However, after attempts to cut costs, including reducing new hires and limiting staff hours, he was fired after six months, later telling a conference that he "just didn't fit with the way they ran the business". In October 2013, Apple hired Angela Ahrendts from Burberry. When Ahrendts left in April 2019, Deirdre O’Brien expanded from Worldwide Sales and Operations, to People, and currently, to People and Retail. In an interview with Funke Mediengruppe in May 2021 she commented, Apple is sticking to its plan to open more stores around the globe in the future, as reported by Bloomberg.

=== Work environment ===
Due to the popularity of the brand, applicants for jobs at Apple Stores are numerous, with many young workers applying. The pace of work is high due to the popularity of the iPhone and iPad. Employees typically work for only a few years as career prospects are limited with no path of advancement other than limited retail management slots. Apple Store employees make above-average pay for retail employees and are offered benefits including 401(k) plans, product discounts, and reduced price on stock. The retention rate for the technicians who staff the Genius Bar is more than 90%.

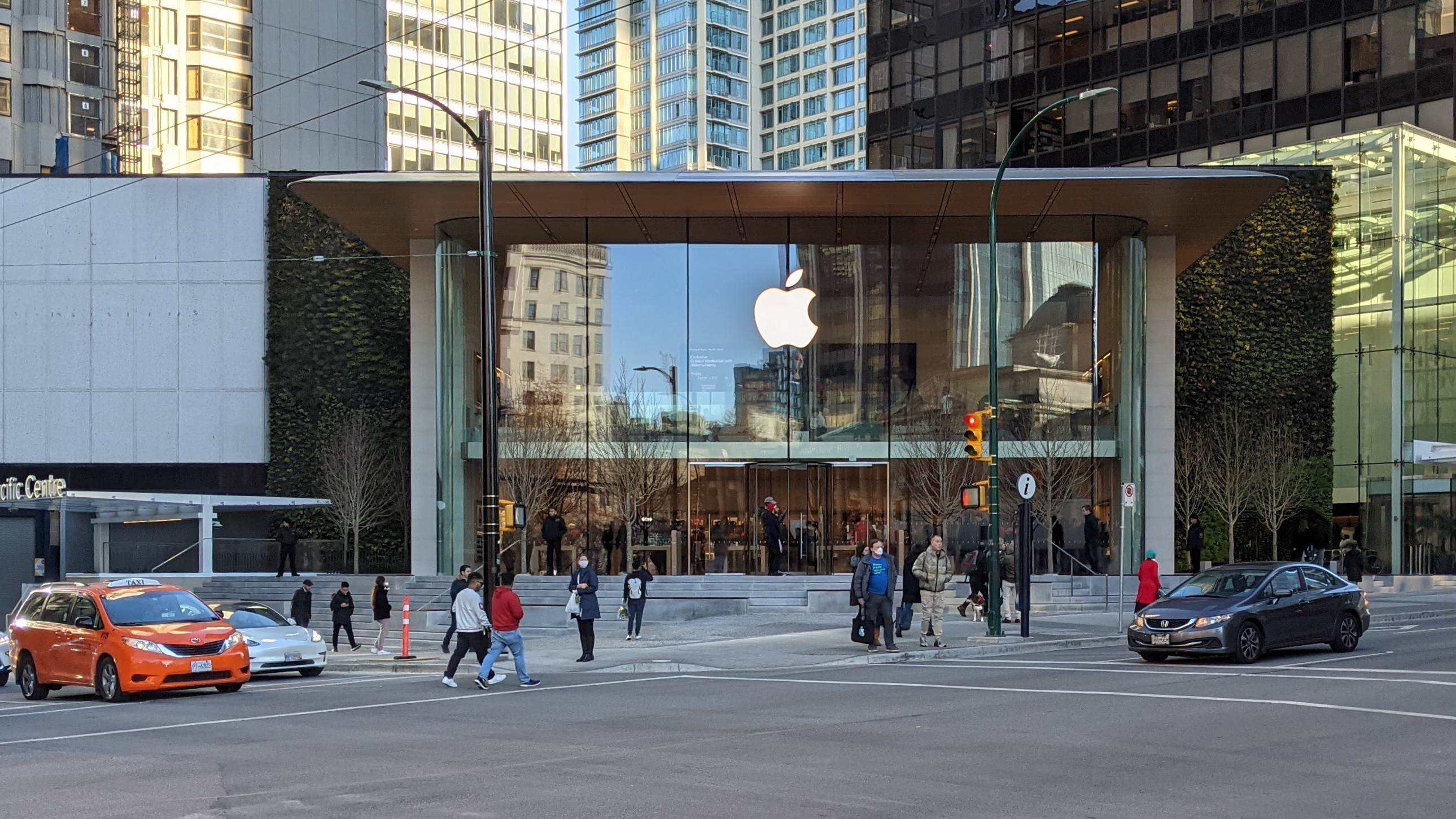
Apple store at Pacific Centre in Vancouver, Canada

A May 2016 Business Insider article featured a lengthy interview with an anonymous Apple Store retail worker in the United Kingdom, where the employee highlighted significant dissatisfaction and issues for retail workers, including harassment and death threats from customers, an intense internal criticism policy that feels "like a cult", a lack of any significant bonus if a worker manages to secure a business contract worth "hundreds of thousands", a lack of promotion opportunities, and are paid so little that many workers are unable to buy products themselves even with a "generous" discount on any Apple product or Apple stock.

According to an April 2022 press release, over 70 percent of the eligible employees at the Cumberland Mall Apple Store in Atlanta, Georgia, were interested in unionizing. The employees asked for a $28 per hour wage, better benefits, and profit-sharing. However, the Towson Town Center Apple Store in Towson, Maryland, became the first store to join a union in June 2022. In April 2026, Apple announced the Towson store would be closing in June. Apple blamed the closing on declining mall business conditions; the union voiced its suspicions of a disguised attempt to bust the union.

== Countries and regions ==
100 or more stores 50–99 stores 20–49 stores 10–19 stores 5–9 stores 2–4 stores 1 store Online store only Online store suspended

Country / Region	Date of first store	Location of first store	Date of latest store	Location of latest store	Number of stores	Ref.
United States	May 19, 2001	Tysons Corner Center, Tysons Corner, Virginia	December 12, 2025	The Shops at Blackstone Valley, Massachusetts	269	
China	July 19, 2008	Sanlitun, Beijing	December 6, 2025	Livat Centre, Beijing	50	
United Kingdom	November 20, 2004	Regent Street, London	July 26, 2025	Solihull, Birmingham	39	
Canada	May 21, 2005	Yorkdale Shopping Centre, Toronto	January 16, 2026	Saint Catherine Street, Montreal	28	
Australia	June 19, 2008	George Street, Sydney	June 27, 2025	Perth City, Perth	22	
France	November 7, 2009	Carrousel du Louvre, Paris	November 18, 2018	Champs-Élysées, Paris	20	
Italy	March 31, 2007	Centro Commerciale Roma Est, Rome	May 27, 2021	Via del Corso, Rome	17	
Germany	December 6, 2008	1 Rosenstrasse, Munich, Bavaria	December 2, 2021	Rosenthaler Strasse, Berlin	16	
Spain	September 4, 2010	La Maquinista, Barcelona	November 28, 2024	La Vaguada, Madrid	12	
Japan	November 30, 2003	Ginza, Tokyo (original)	September 26, 2025	Ginza, Tokyo (renovated 2022–2025)	11	
South Korea	January 27, 2018	Garosu-gil, Seoul	January 20, 2024	Hongdae, Seoul, South Korea	7	
Hong Kong	September 24, 2011	ifc Mall, Central and Western District	September 22, 2016	apm Hong Kong	6	
India	April 18, 2023	Bandra Kurla Complex, Mumbai, Maharashtra	February 26, 2026	Sky City Mall, Mumbai, Maharashtra	6	
United Arab Emirates	October 29, 2015	Mall of the Emirates, Dubai; Yas Mall, Abu Dhabi	September 25, 2025	Al Jimi Mall, Al Ain	5	
Switzerland	September 25, 2008	Rue de Rive, Geneva	July 12, 2014	Freie Strasse, Basel	4	
Netherlands	March 3, 2012	Hirschbuilding, Leidseplein, Amsterdam	August 9, 2014	De Passage, The Hague	3	
Singapore	May 27, 2017	Orchard Road	September 10, 2020	Marina Bay Sands	3	
Turkey	April 5, 2014	Zorlu Center, Istanbul	October 22, 2021	Bağdat Caddesi, Istanbul	3	
Sweden	September 15, 2012	Westfield Täby Centrum, Täby	September 20, 2024	Westfield Mall of Scandinavia, Solna	3	
Brazil	February 15, 2014	VillageMall, Barra da Tijuca, Rio de Janeiro	April 18, 2015	Morumbi, São Paulo	2	
Macau	June 25, 2016	Galaxy Macau	June 29, 2018	The Londoner Macao	2	
Taiwan	July 1, 2017	Taipei 101, Taipei	June 15, 2019	Xinyi A13, Taipei	2	
Mexico	September 24, 2016	Centro Santa Fe, Santa Fe, Mexico City	September 28, 2019	Centro Comercial Antara Fashion Hall, Mexico City	2	
Thailand	November 10, 2018	Iconsiam, Bangkok	July 31, 2020	CentralWorld, Bangkok	2	
Belgium	September 19, 2015	Avenue de la Toison d’Or, Brussels			1	
Austria	February 24, 2018	Kärntner Straße, Vienna			1	
Malaysia	June 22, 2024	The Exchange TRX, Kuala Lumpur			1	
Total					537 stores	

== History ==
=== Third-party retail ===
Steve Jobs, co-founder of Apple, returned to the company as interim CEO in 1997. According to his biographer Walter Isaacson, Jobs began a concerted campaign to help sales by improving the retail presentation of Macintosh computers. Even with new products launched under his watch, like the iMac and the PowerBook G3 and an online store, Apple still relied heavily on big-box computer and electronics stores for most of its sales. There, customers continued to deal with poorly trained and ill-maintained Mac sections that did not foster customer loyalty to Apple and did not help differentiate the Mac user experience from Windows. In fact, the retailer trend was towards selling their own generic in-house brand PCs which used even cheaper components than those by major PC makers, increasing retailer overall margins by keeping the manufacturing profits. This "provided a powerful profit motive to convert customers interested in buying a Mac into the owners of a new, cheaply assembled, house brand PC".

Tim Cook, who joined Apple in 1998 as Senior Vice President for Worldwide Operations, announced the company would "cut some channel partners that may not be providing the buying experience [Apple expects]. We're not happy with everybody." Jobs severed Apple's ties with every big box retailer, including Sears, Montgomery Ward, Best Buy, Circuit City, Computer City, and OfficeMax to focus its retail efforts with CompUSA—which reached an agreement to establish dedicated departments for Apple hardware, staffed by trained employees and representatives. Apple also worked with local user groups to promote launch events for new hardware and Mac OS releases.

Between 1997 and 2000, the number of Mac authorized resellers dropped from 20,000 to just 11,000. The majority of these were cuts made by Apple itself. Jobs proclaimed that Apple would be targeting Dell as a competitor, with Cook's mandate to match or exceed Dell's lean inventories and streamlined supply chain. Jobs made an open statement to Michael Dell, "with our new products and our new store and our new build-to-order, we're coming after you, buddy." While Dell had operated as direct mail order and online order company, having pulled out of retailers to realize greater profit margins and efficiency, Apple had direct orders with sales handled by its channel partners, other mail order resellers, independent dealerships, and the new relationship with CompUSA.

After a retail design concept by Marc Newson was abandoned, a revised concept for an Apple "store-within-a-store" was designed by Eight Inc.., a San Francisco-based firm who had developed Apple's presences at the MacWorld expo; they were designed as a self-contained showroom with more minimalistic design that emphasized the products themselves. After a trial at retail outlets in Japan, CompUSA began to adopt the new concept for its locations beginning in 1999. The "store within a store" approach still had shortcomings; acting as a mystery shopper, Macworld writer David Pogue observed that all but one of the locations he visited had employees who actively steered him towards Windows PCs and attacked Macs (such as claiming they did not have software available); the company's PR director Suzanne Shelton stated that finding "specialized" talent was difficult. Despite this, CompUSA sales of Macs had increased. Apple then added Best Buy as a second authorized reseller. Challenges still remained, as resellers' profit margins on selling Macs was only around 9%, and selling Macs was only worthwhile if ongoing service and support contracts were provided, of which retailer experiences were inconsistent.

=== Online store ===
In 1997, the year Steve Jobs returned to Apple, Dell founder and CEO Michael Dell was asked how he would fix Apple. Dell responded: "I'd shut it down and give the money back to the shareholders". This angered Jobs, due to Dell's success with its online store originally built by NeXT, his former business that Apple acquired to bring Jobs back. A team of Apple and former-NeXT employees spent several months building an online store that would be better than Dell's. On November 10, 1997, Steve Jobs announced the online store at an Apple press event, and during his keynote speech, he said: "I guess what we want to tell you, Michael, is that with our new products and our new store and our new build-to-order manufacturing, we're coming after you, buddy."

In August 2015, Apple revamped the online storefront, removing the dedicated "Store" tab and making the entire website a retail experience. Later, in August 2021, a redesigned store section of the website returned, with products still being able to be purchased directly through their respective pages.

Jobs ended the Macintosh clone licensing program, and in September 1997, acquired the largest clone manufacturer, Power Computing. In November 1997, the online Apple Store launched and adopted a build-to-order manufacturing model similar to that used by Dell. By the end of 1997, Jobs had returned Apple to profitability, reporting a profit of $309 million.

=== Origins ===
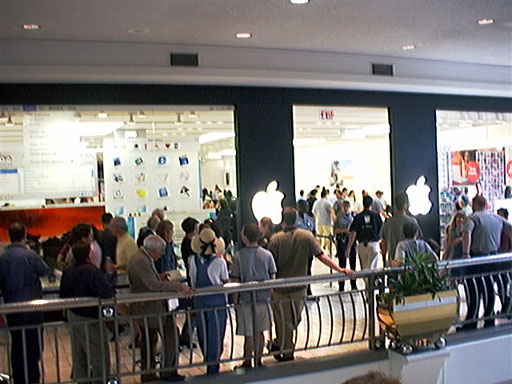
Line at the grand opening of the first Apple store, at Tysons Corner Center, in 2001

Jobs believed the Apple retail program needed to fundamentally change the relationship to the customer, and provide more control over the presentation of Apple products and the brand. Jobs recognized the limitations of third-party retailing and began investigating options to change the model.

In 1999, Jobs personally recruited Millard Drexler, former CEO of Gap Inc., to serve on Apple's board of directors. Apple then hired Allen Moyer, a former Walt Disney Imagineering executive, to lead real estate and construction for the retail program. In 2000, Apple hired Ron Johnson, vice president of merchandising at Target, to serve as Apple's senior vice president of retail operations.

The retail and development teams, headed by Moyer, began constructing a series of mock-up Apple Stores inside a secured warehouse in Cupertino to test different layouts and design concepts. Jobs collaborated with Johnson, architect Art Gensler, and design firm Eight Inc. in developing the final store design. Gensler's firm was retained to design the first 100 Apple Store locations.

On May 15, 2001, Jobs hosted a press event at the Tysons Corner Center store in Tysons, Virginia, near Washington, D.C., one of Apple's first two retail stores. Both the Tysons Corner and Glendale Galleria in Glendale, California stores opened at 10 a.m. local time on May 19, with the Tysons Corner location opening three hours earlier than Glendale because of the time difference between the East and West coasts. More than 7,700 people visited the two stores during their opening weekend, spending a combined US$599,000 (equivalent to $1,089,000 in 2025).

=== Expansion ===
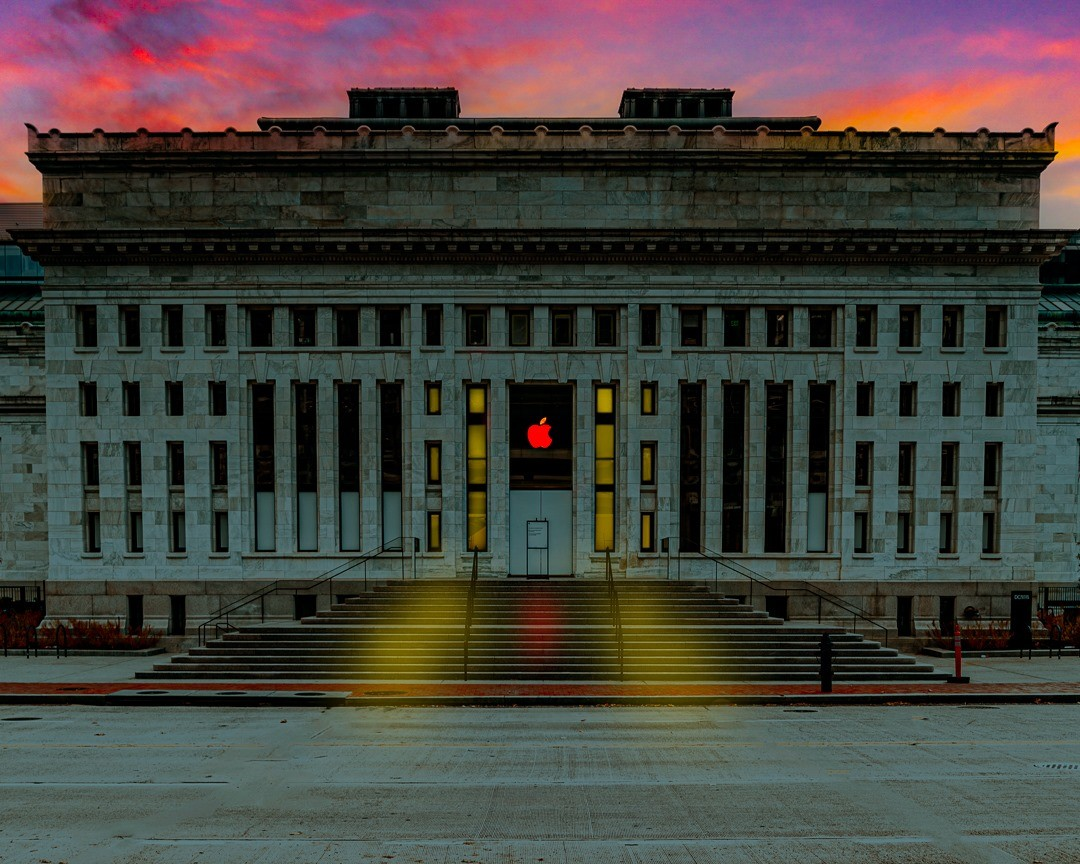
An Apple Store located at the Carnegie Library in Washington, D.C., opened in 2019.

Several publications and analysts predicted the failure of Apple Stores. However, the Apple retail program established its merits, bypassing the sales-per-square-foot measurement of competing nearby stores, and in 2004 reached $1 billion in annual sales, the fastest of any retailer in history. Sales continued to grow, reaching $1 billion a quarter by 2006. Then-CEO Steve Jobs said that "People haven't been willing to invest this much time and money or engineering in a store before", adding that "It's not important if the customer knows that. They just feel it. They feel something's a little different." In 2011, Apple Stores in the United States had an average revenue of $473,000 for each employee. According to research firm RetailSails, the Apple Store chain ranked first among US retailers in terms of sales per unit area in 2011, almost doubling Tiffany, the second retailer on the list. On a global level, all Apple Stores had a combined revenue of US$16 billion. Under the leadership of Ron Johnson, the former senior Vice President of Retail Operations, the Apple Stores have, according to an article in The New York Times, been responsible for "[turning] the boring computer sales floor into a sleek playroom filled with gadgets". The Apple Stores have also been credited with raising the company's brand equity, with Scott Galloway, Professor of Marketing at New York University Stern School of Business, stating that the Stores are the "temple to the brand which is this unbelievable experience called an Apple Store, and then you have this very mediocre experience called an AT&T or Verizon connect your phone experience for Samsung and the other Android players".

Apple has since re-established ties with major big box retailers like Best Buy and Staples. Authorized Apple resellers have a dedicated store-within-a-store section, offering a distinctive Apple-style experience to showcase products. The relationship with Best Buy calls for the company to send Apple Solutions Consultants (ASCs) to train Best Buy employees to be familiar with Apple's product lineup.

In an interview with Funke Mediengruppe in May 2021, Deirdre O'Brien commented, "Apple is sticking to its plan to open more stores around the globe in the future."

=== Influence ===
Apple Stores have considerably changed the landscape for consumer electronics retailers and influenced other technological companies to follow suit. According to The Globe and Mail, "Apple’s retail stores have taken traffic, control and profits away from Verizon as well as electronics retailers, such as Best Buy, that once looked at wireless phones as a lucrative profit source". CNET has reported that the "Apple retail experience hurts Best Buy" and noted, "Buy a MacBook at the Apple Store and it's hard to go back to the Best Buy Windows laptop buying experience". The publication also wrote that "Apple salespeople are generally more knowledgeable, the products themselves are generally higher quality, and the stores are more appealing, aesthetically and practically."

In October 2009, reports surfaced that Steve Jobs and his retail team would help "drastically overhaul" Disney Stores. His involvement was described by The New York Times as "particularly notable", given his work on the "highly successful" Apple Stores and his election to Disney's board of directors in 2006.

In August 2009, the London Evening Standard reported that Apple's first store in the United Kingdom, at Regent Street, was the most profitable shop of its size in London, with the highest sales per square foot, taking in £60 million a year, or £2,000 per square foot.

Many other electronics retailers from around the world such as Huawei, Samsung, and Xiaomi started to follow the designing trend of Apple Store.

=== Redesign ===
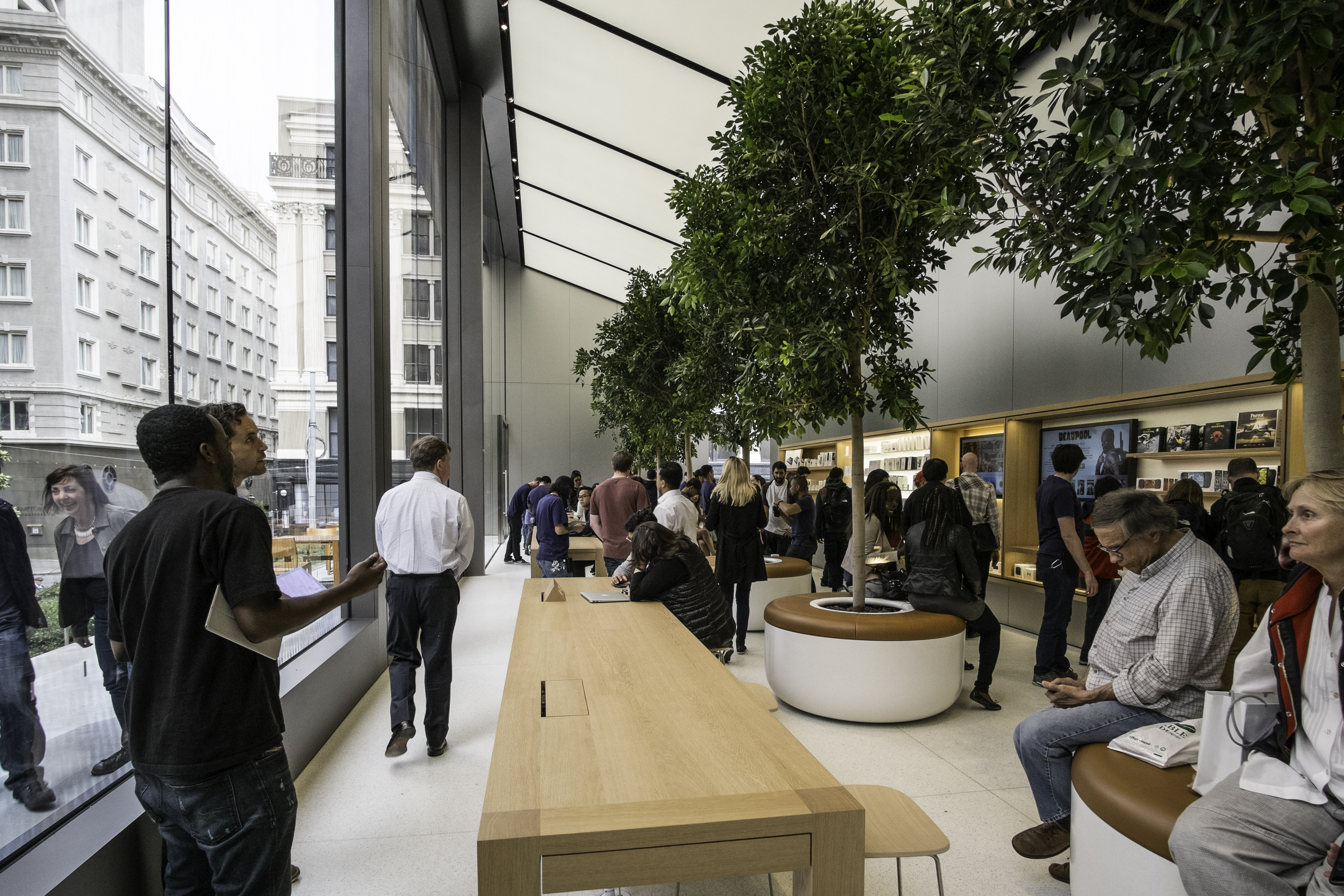
The Genius Grove at Union Square, San Francisco, after renovation in May 2016

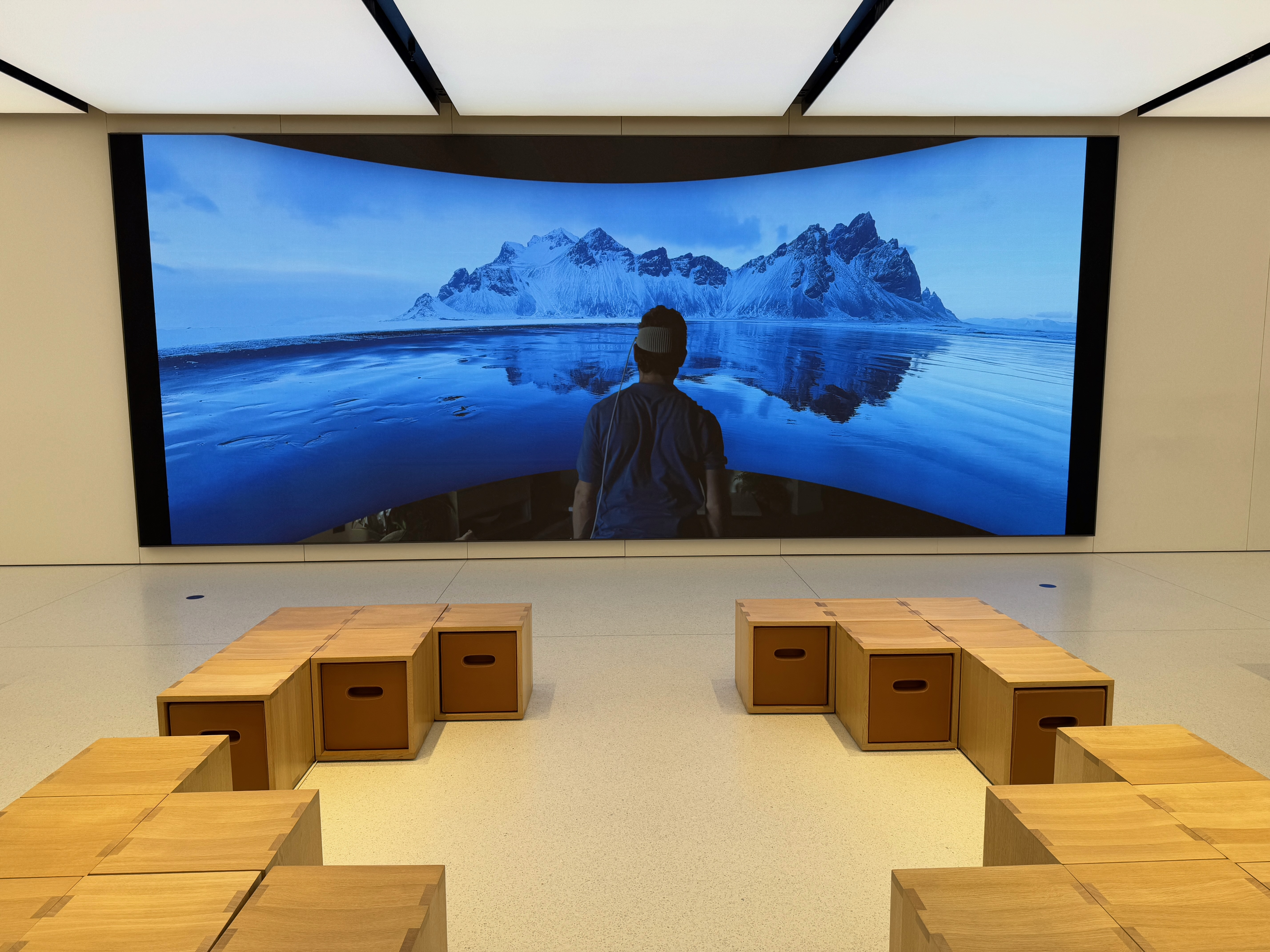
Video wall

In May 2016, Apple significantly redesigned its Union Square Apple Store in downtown San Francisco, adding large glass doors for the entry, open spaces with touch-sensitive tables and shelves for product displays, and rebranded rooms for the store. "The Avenue" is the central location for hardware, as well as for receiving advice from salespersons and "Creative Pros" with specialized knowledge of music, photography, creativity, and apps. The "Genius Bar" becomes the "Genius Grove", a tree-lined area for help and support. "The Forum" features a large video screen and offers game nights, sessions with experts in creative arts, and community events. "The Plaza", while limited to select locations, offers a "park-like" space outside the store featuring free 24/7 Wi-Fi access and will host live concerts on some weekends. Designed by Jony Ive and Angela Ahrendts, the idea was to make Apple Stores into "town squares", in which people come naturally to the store as a gathering place, and to "help foster human experiences that draw people out of their digital bubbles". The new design will be adopted to every store Apple has, and while renovation is undergoing, stores are either relocated or temporarily closed.

In April 2017, Apple announced that its "Today at Apple" educational sessions, which launched with its Union Square redesign in 2016 and offer more than 60 free hands-on sessions for creative skills, will also be expanded to all of its stores.

Starting May 2018, a Video Wall was added to stores around the world, and upgraded in some stores like Apple Palo Alto.

== Genius Bar ==
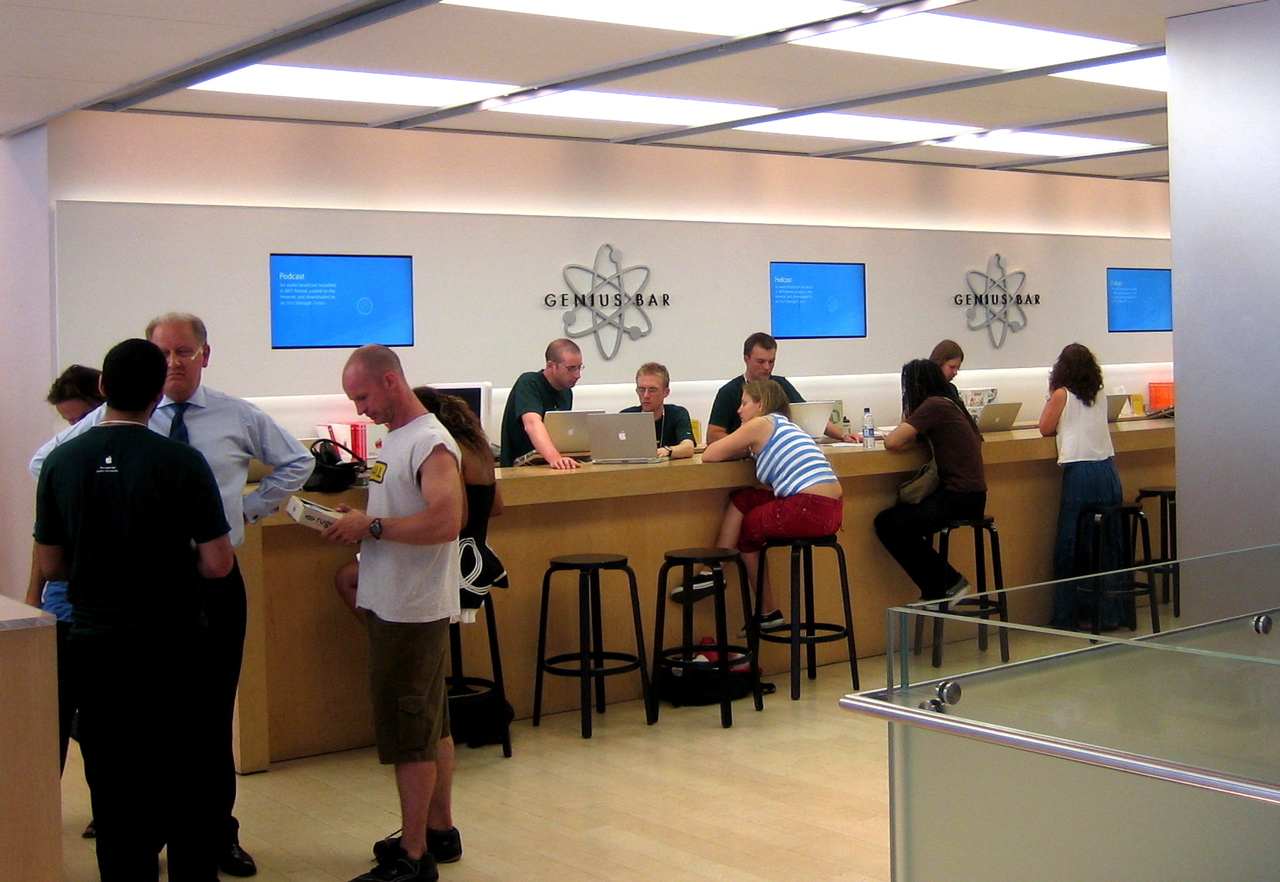
The Genius Bar at Apple Store Regent Street, London

All Apple Stores feature a Genius Bar (besides Apple Park Visitor Center), where customers can receive technical advice or set up service and repair for their products. The Genius Bar provides hardware service on products that are not classified vintage or obsolete. However, in most cases the Geniuses will at least attempt to assist customers with older hardware.

The Genius Bar at Apple Stores offers same-day service for both OLED/LCD screen and lithium-ion battery replacement. If the in-house technician needs to send the affected device to an Apple Repair Center, most repaired or replaced iPhones will be returned or ready for pickup in approximately 3 business days.

In May 2017, Apple launched a new program called Today at Apple. Customers can come in and receive free training from a Creative in more than 60 different sessions. Topics include basic device knowledge, Apple's professional film, and music editing software, coding for kids, and tools for using Apple products in classroom-based learning.

The largest Genius Bar in the world is located in Amsterdam.

== Store openings ==
Apple Store openings and new product releases can draw crowds of hundreds, with some waiting in line as much as a day before the opening. The opening of New York City's Fifth Avenue store in 2006 was highly frequented, and had visitors from Europe who flew in for the event. The opening of Apple Michigan Avenue was attended by Tim Cook and Illinois Governor Bruce Rauner, among hundreds of others.

== Stores at corporate locations ==
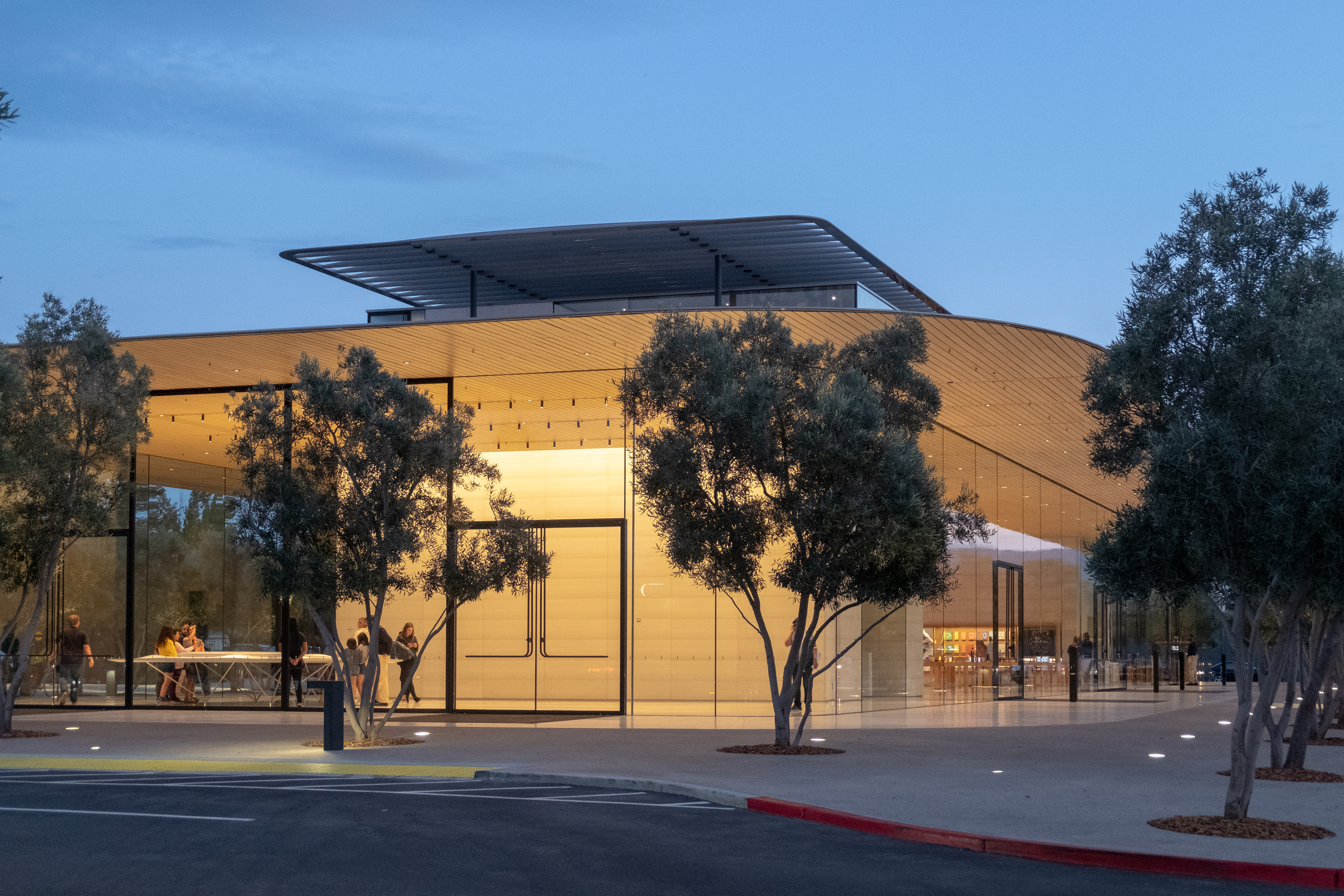
Apple Park Visitor Center

In 1993, Apple opened a store, then known as The Company Store, at its Apple Campus on Infinite Loop in Cupertino, California. Predating the modern Apple Store chain, the store was, at the time, the only place in the world where Apple merchandise could be purchased, including T-shirts, mugs, and pens. In June 2015, the store was closed for renovations, and in September it was reopened, offering a new design resembling other Apple Store locations and, for the first time, selling iPhones. The Infinite Loop location closed on January 20, 2024.

As part of the process of moving its corporate headquarters to the new Apple Park complex, a similar store with exclusive merchandise opened as part of the Apple Park Visitor Center on November 17, 2017.

On June 15, 2023, Apple opened a store in the shopping mall of Battersea Power Station, London. The power station building serves as the company's UK headquarters, though the store is not actually connected to the offices.

== Imitations ==
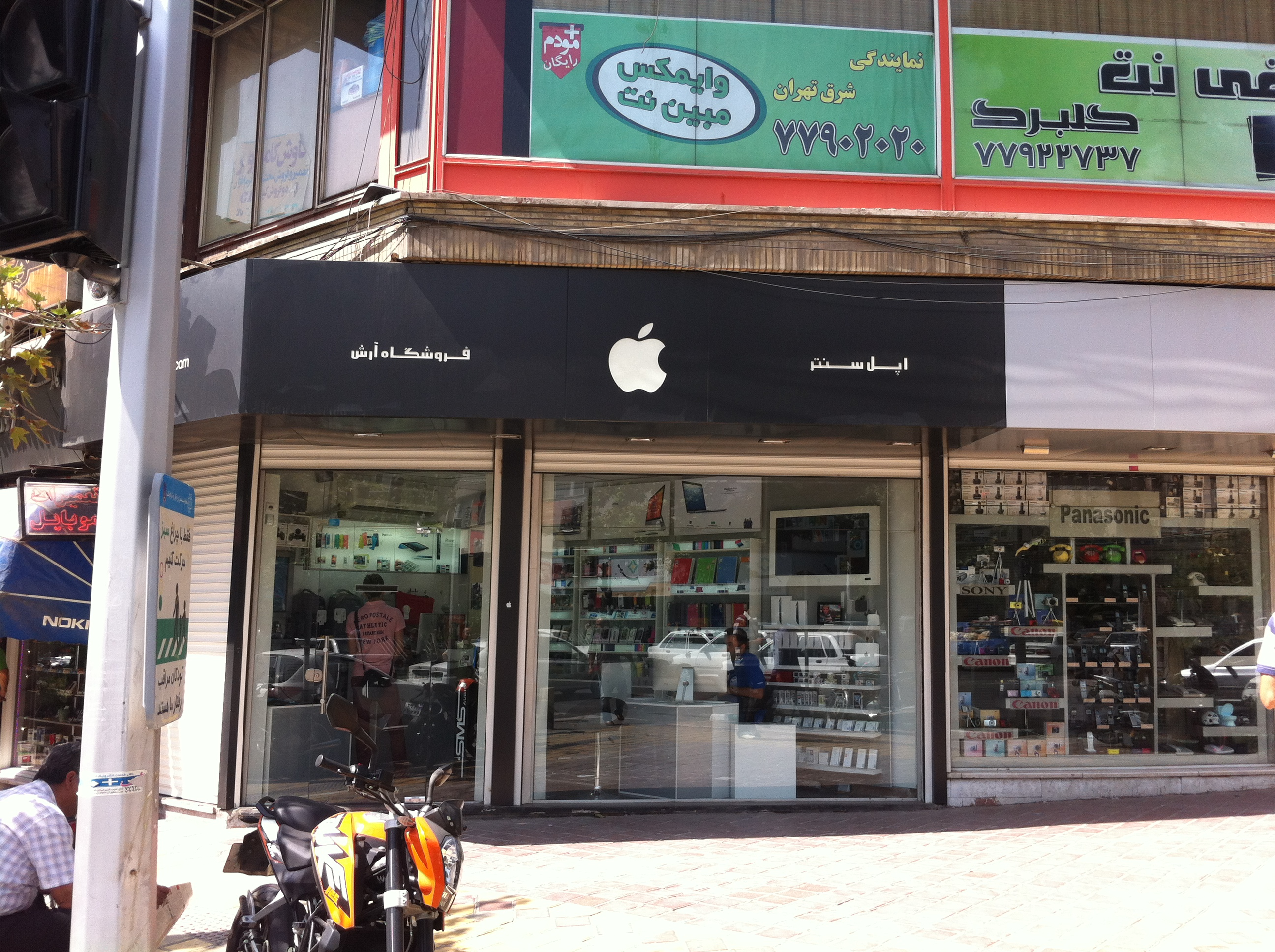
An unauthorized Apple Store in Tehran, Iran

In July 2011, an American expatriate blogger who lives in the southwestern Chinese city of Kunming reported on her discovery of what she called "the best ripoff store we had ever seen"—a fake Apple Store, complete with the glass exterior, wood display tables, winding staircase and large promotional posters found in legitimate Apple Stores, and with employees wearing lanyards and the same T-shirts as actual Apple Store employees. The Wall Street Journal reported that the store had "gotten widespread international attention for the remarkable lengths to which its proprietors seem to have gone to mimic the look and feel of a real Apple Store." The fake Apple Store was mentioned by US presidential contender Mitt Romney in the second 2012 election debate. Chinese law prohibits retailers from copying the look and feel of competitors' stores, but enforcement is lax.

According to The Wall Street Journal, unauthorized Apple resellers are found throughout China; the blogger's original post noted that two such stores were located within walking distance of the first knockoff, one of them with a misspelled sign reading "Apple Stoer". An employee of the first knockoff confirmed that the store was not one of the 13 authorized Apple resellers in Kunming. In a follow-up report, Reuters indicated that local authorities in Kunming had closed two fake Apple Stores in that city due to lack of official business permits, but allowed three other such stores to stay open, including the one that had attracted international attention. The operators of that store had applied for a reseller license from Apple. At the time of the report, only four legitimate Apple Stores had opened in China, with two in Beijing and two in Shanghai.

These imitation Apple Store locations should not be confused with Apple Premium Resellers, which are independent businesses authorized to sell Apple products, and which are expected by Apple to offer services comparable to the company's corporate stores and a similar store design aesthetic. Apple Premium Resellers typically operate in countries and suburban communities not served by Apple Stores.

== See also ==
- ComputerWare
- Google Store
- Microsoft Store
- Samsung Experience Store
