= Microsoft Store (retail) =

Chain of retail stores and online shopping site operated by Microsoft

- Type: Subsidiary
- Industry: Computer hardware; Computer software; Consumer electronics; Distribution
- Founded: October 22, 2009; 17 years ago
- Defunct: June 26, 2020
- Fate: Closed by parent
- Number of locations: World: 116 stores in 4 countries and 1 territory (107 US/10 overseas): United States: 106; Canada: 8; Australia: 1; United Kingdom: 1; Puerto Rico: 1
- Key people: Steve Ballmer; Satya Nadella (CEO)
- Products: Surface; Xbox; Virtual reality; Windows 10; Office 365; Microsoft & third-party software and accessories; Computer Repair
- Parent: Microsoft
- Website: www.microsoftstore.com

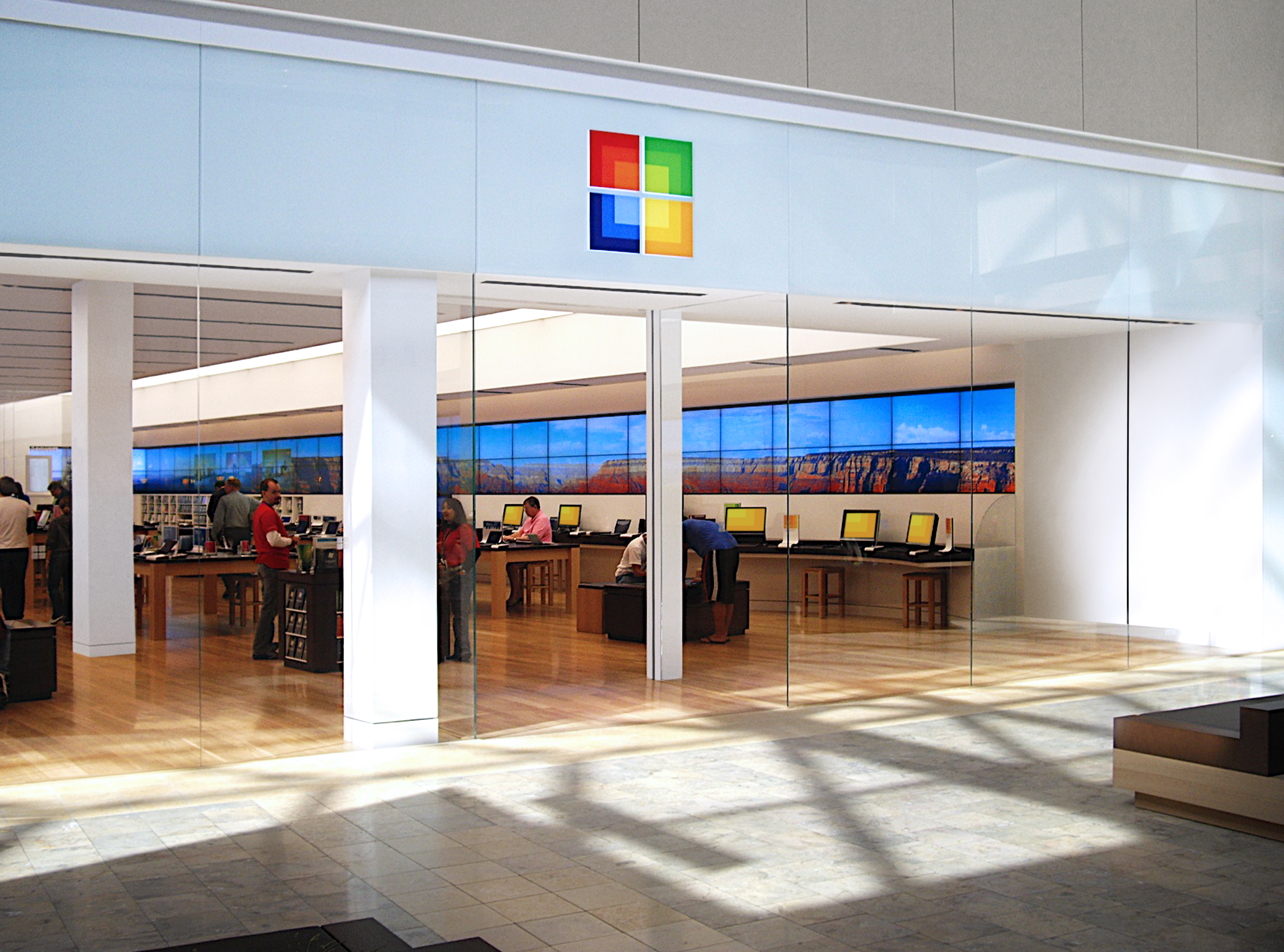
A Microsoft Store bearing the 2009–2012 logo

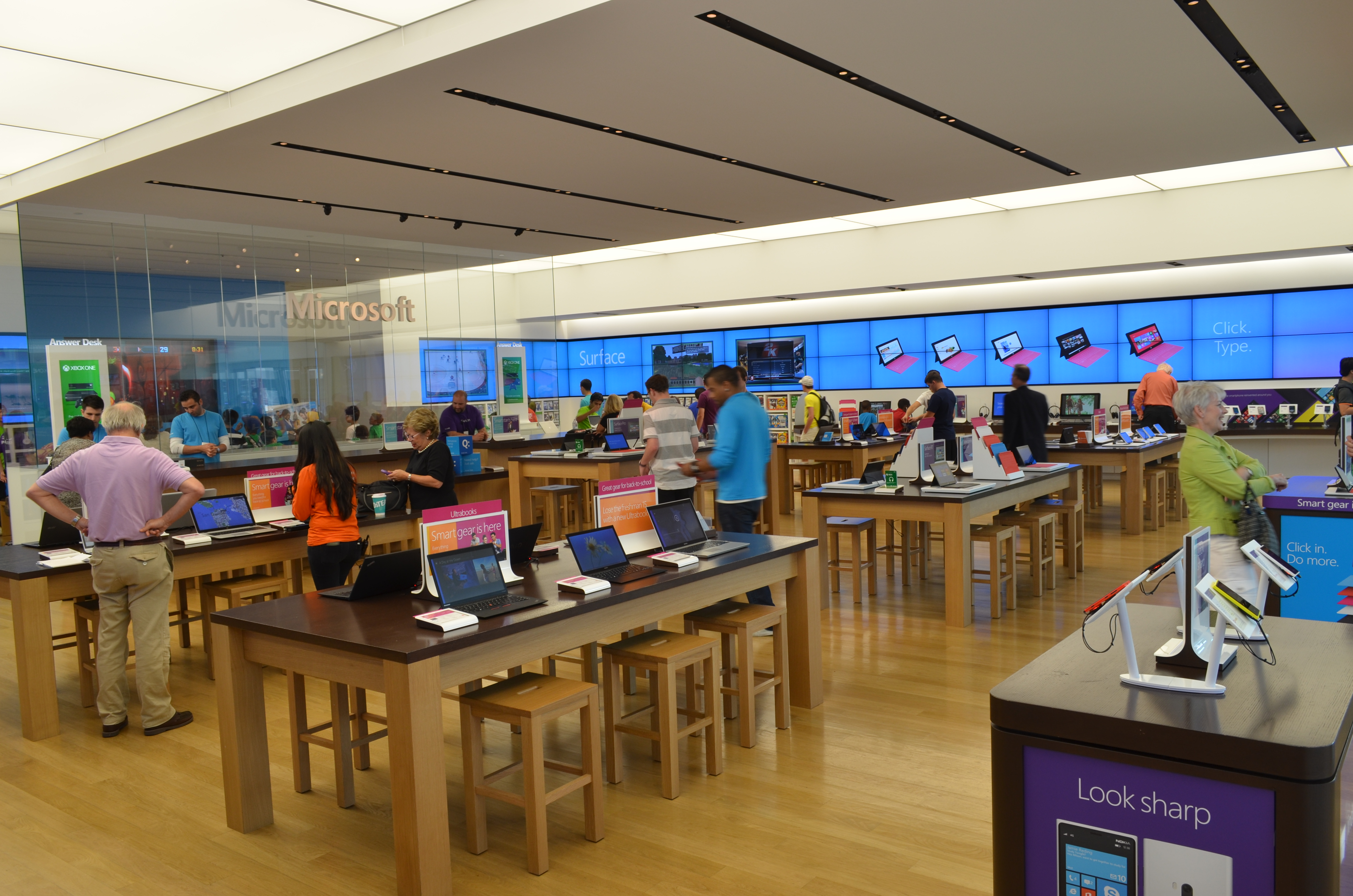
Microsoft Store in Yorkdale, Toronto, the first store located outside the U.S.

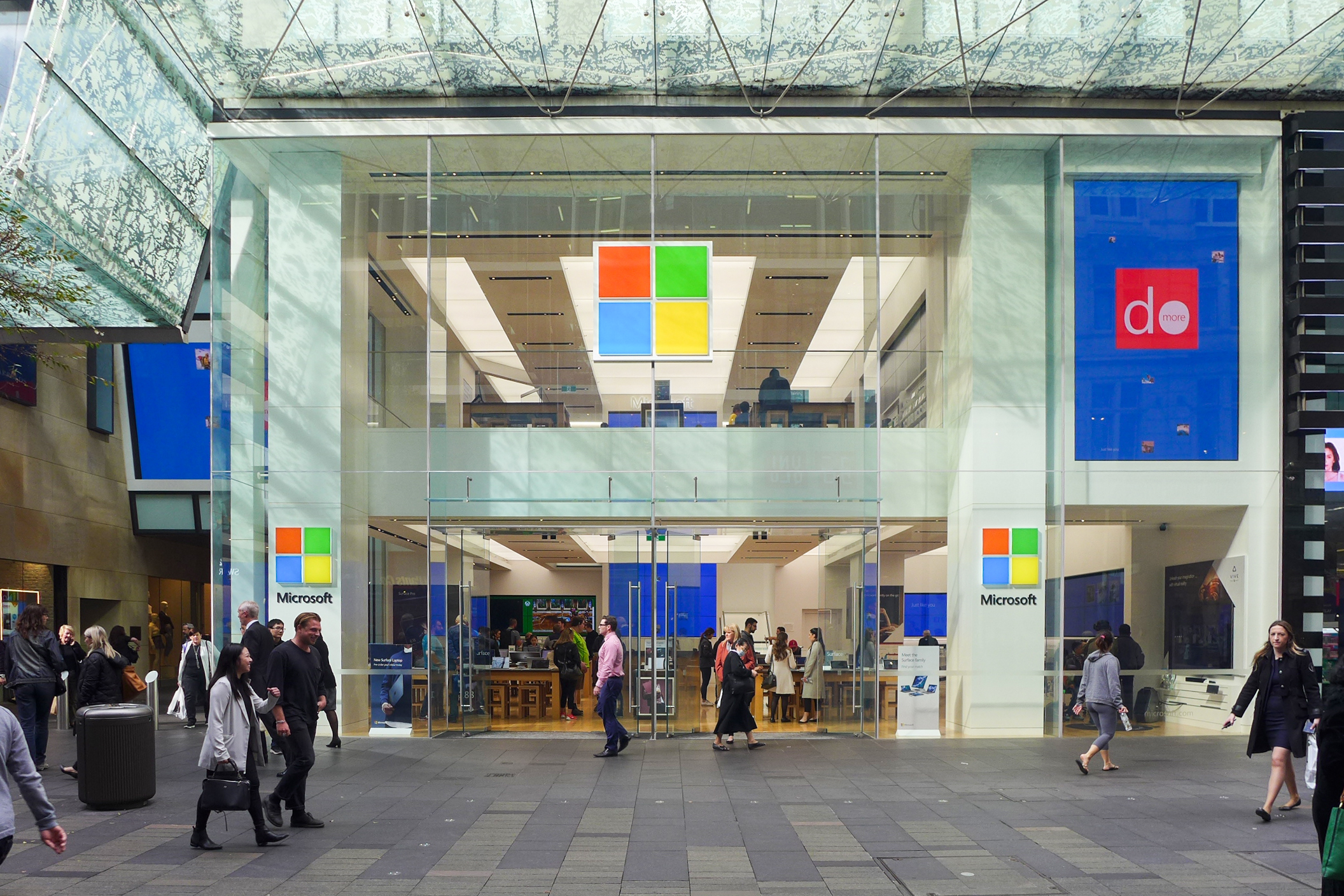
Microsoft Store in Sydney (closed on May 10, 2025)

Microsoft Store was a chain of retail stores and is an online shopping site, owned and operated by Microsoft and dealing in computers, computer software, and consumer electronics.

The Microsoft Store offered Signature PCs and tablets like the Microsoft Surface, and offerings from third parties such as Acer, Dell, HP, Lenovo, and VAIO without demos nor trialware (pre-installed free trials of certain third-party software that expire after a limited time). It also offered Windows (most retail versions), Microsoft Office, and Xbox One game consoles, games, and services including on-site Xbox diagnostics. The Answers Desk helped to answer questions related to Office, Windows, and other Microsoft products; the stores also offered class sessions as well as individual appointments.

The first two Microsoft Stores opened within a week of the Windows 7 launch, in Scottsdale, Arizona, and Mission Viejo, California. Additional stores opened in California, Colorado, Florida, Georgia, Illinois, Minnesota, Missouri, Texas, Virginia, and Washington. At the 2011 Professional Developers Conference, Microsoft announced that they intended to open 75 new stores in the next three years.

The first store outside the U.S. (and the first of eight stores in Canada) opened in Toronto on November 16, 2012, while the first store outside North America (and first store in Asia-Pacific and second flagship store) opened in Sydney, Australia, on November 12, 2015. In September 2017, the company announced a store on Regent Street in London, England.

On June 26, 2020, Microsoft announced that it would close all of its physical stores once COVID-19 pandemic restrictions are lifted, and transition to a digital-only model. Four stores in New York City, Sydney, London, and Redmond would be renovated into Microsoft Experience Centers.

As of 2025, only New York City (Microsoft Experience Center) and Redmond (Microsoft Visitor Center) stores remain open. The London and Sydney stores were closed in 2025.

== History ==
Microsoft's first retail store was located in the Metreon in San Francisco. It was owned and operated by Sony Retail Entertainment and ran from 1999 to 2001.

In 2009, Microsoft built a "Retail Experience Center" in their Redmond, Washington, headquarters and announced plans to build its own retail stores. On October 22, 2009, the same day as the Windows 7 launch, Microsoft opened a retail store in Scottsdale, Arizona. A week later, another opened in Mission Viejo, California. Five additional stores were opened in 2010. A ninth store opened in Atlanta in May 2011, with two more openings planned in Houston and Los Angeles by the end of June.

The majority of Microsoft Stores were closed in March 2020 due to the COVID-19 pandemic. On June 26, 2020, Microsoft announced that it would permanently close all of its physical retail stores in favor of a digital marketplace. Four stores would be renovated into "experience centers": New York City, Sydney, London, and Redmond.

In 2025, Microsoft closed its London store on January 31 and its Sydney store on May 10, leaving New York City and Redmond as the only remaining stores.

== Shopping experience ==
The Microsoft Store was similar to the popular Apple Store concept, which has been largely successful. The concept aimed to give a greater level of customer satisfaction both by only having sales staff as well as by employing "Service Advisors" (similar to Apple's "Geniuses") to assist customers with technical questions and issues. In addition, "Specialists" (or trainers) were employed to show customers how to get the most out of their software. Xbox One consoles were also available to entertain patrons.

== Retail locations ==
Map of Microsoft Store locations in the United States (until 2020)

There were Microsoft Store retail locations throughout the U.S., seven in Canada, one in Sydney, Australia, and one in London, England, which were converted to Experience Centers. Recently, Microsoft has opened Microsoft Company Stores in Redmond and at its Silicon Valley Campus that are open to the public.

== Other formats ==
=== Microsoft Specialty Stores ===
In May 2013, Microsoft began to launch mall kiosk locations known as Microsoft Specialty Stores, expanding upon the Surface-focused pop-up stores established during the launch of Windows 8. They featured a smaller product offering, with a particular focus on the Surface and Windows Phone product lines.

In June 2019, Microsoft closed all Specialty Store locations.

=== Best Buy Windows Stores ===
On June 13, 2013, Microsoft announced a partnership with the Best Buy chain to replace their Best Buy's PC departments with The Windows Store (unrelated to the Windows Store software distribution platform) at 600 locations in the United States and Canada, by September 2013. The store-within-a-store showcases Windows devices, Microsoft hardware and software products (including the Office, Surface, and Xbox lines). Departments for other manufacturers (such as Apple, Google, and Samsung) remain separate from the Windows Store sections. Best Buy also pledged to add 1,200 Microsoft-trained sales associates to its stores and to stock more accessories for Microsoft-related products, such as Windows Phone devices.

== See also ==
- Apple Store
- Google Store
