= Deirdre O'Brien =

American businesswoman

- Born: c. 1966
- Citizenship: US
- Education: Michigan State University; San Jose State University
- Occupations: Senior Vice President, Retail Apple Inc.
- Employer: Apple Inc.
- Website: apple.com/leadership/deirdre-obrien

Deirdre O'Brien (born c. 1966) is an American businesswoman and the senior vice president of retail at Apple Inc. At Apple, O'Brien leads Apple's retail stores and online teams.

She was ranked 43rd on Fortune's list of Most Powerful Women in 2023. In 2021, O'Brien was 11th in Fast Company's Queer 50 list. In 2022, she was 12th on the list.

== Biography ==
With Apple since 1988, her responsibilities as an Apple VP have expanded and contracted over time, she previously led the people team in addition to retail. O'Brien holds a bachelor's degree in operations management from Michigan State University and an MBA from San Jose State University.
