= Myron E. Ullman =

American businessman (1946–2024)

- Born: Myron Edward Ullman III; November 26, 1946; Youngstown, Ohio, U.S.
- Died: August 6, 2024 (aged 77); Colorado, U.S.
- Education: University of Cincinnati
- Occupation: Businessman
- Spouse: Cathy Emmons (m. 1969)
- Children: 6

Myron Edward "Mike" Ullman III (November 26, 1946 – August 6, 2024) was an American businessman. During his career, he led Macy's and was the chairman and CEO of J. C. Penney. Ullman served as Penney's CEO twice: first from December 2004 through October 2011, when he was succeeded by Ron Johnson, and then again after Johnson's departure, from April 2013 through July 2015 when Ullman stepped down.

== Background ==
Born in Youngstown, Ohio, on November 26, 1946, Ullman had six siblings, and his parents were residents of Canfield, Ohio, where he grew up. He attended the University of Cincinnati and graduated in 1969; later that year, he married Cathy Emons, with whom he would go on to have six children.

== Career ==
Ullman began his career at IBM and went on to work at the University of Cincinnati as its vice president for business affairs. In the 1980s, he worked for Federated Department Stores and Hong Kong's Wharf Holdings.

Ullman served as a White House Fellow in the Office of the United States Trade Representative in 1981-82.

Ullman joined Macy's in 1988 and was its CEO from 1992 to 1995. Thereafter, he spent a stint at DFS Group, during which it was acquired by LVMH. He then began his stints at J. C. Penney, during which he sought to differentiate it from its competition by embracing higher-end brands.

On June 26, 2018, Ullman succeeded Howard Schultz as Chairman of Starbucks Corporation. He held that position until 2021.

Ullman was on the boards of numerous charitable organizations, including serving as Chairman of Mercy Ships from 2001 to 2021 and as a founding board member of Mother's Choice, a foster care charity in Hong Kong.

== Health and death ==
Ullman had a neurological disorder which gradually limited his mobility. He adapted to this by often using a Segway.

Ullman died on August 6, 2024, at the age of 77, from complications of cancer and Alzheimer's disease. Sources differed on whether he died at his home in Montrose, Colorado, or a hospice in Grand Junction, Colorado.
