= Ron Johnson (businessman) =

American businessman

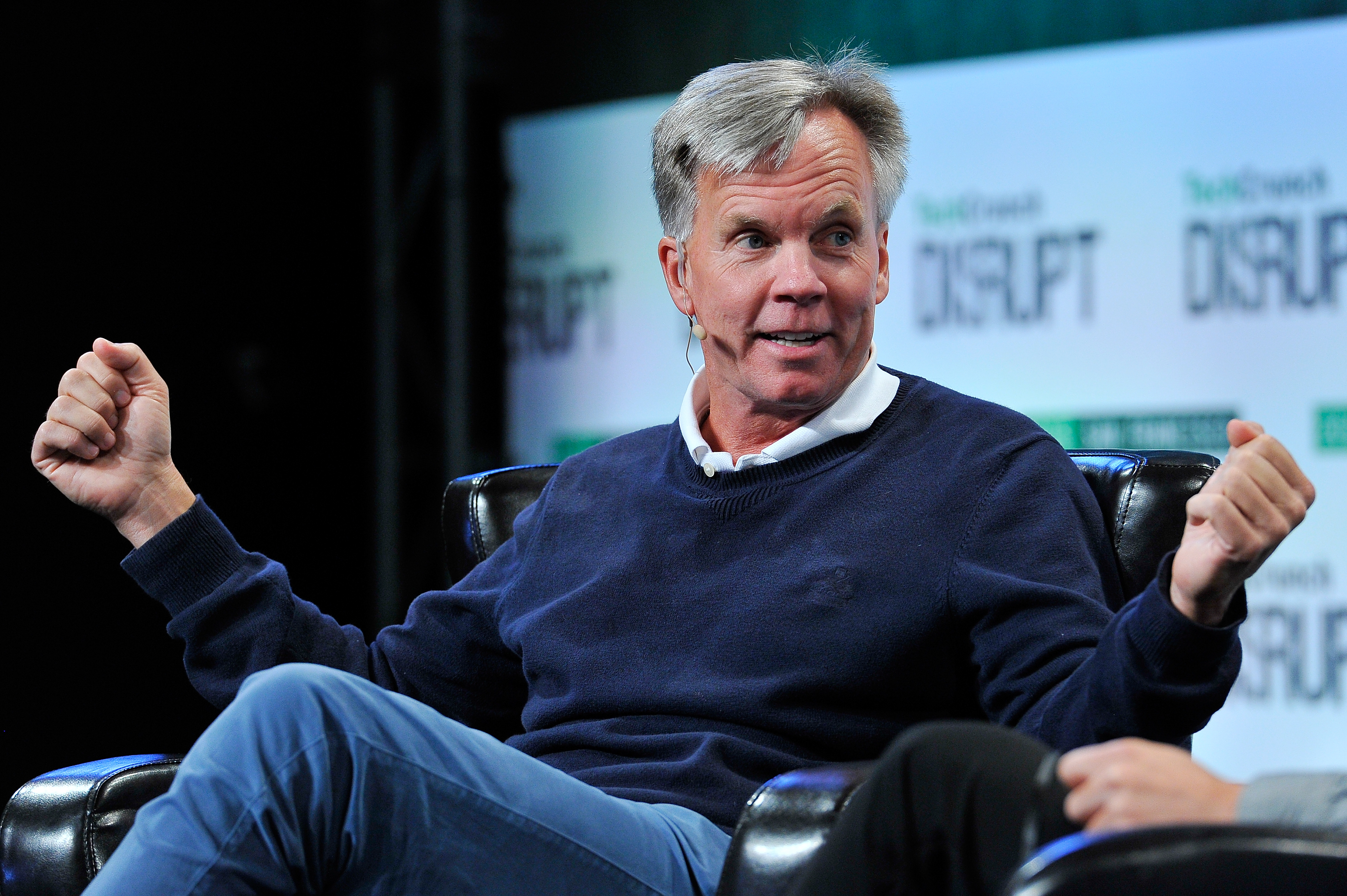
- Johnson in 2015
- Born: October 15, 1959 (age 67)
- Education: Stanford University (B.A.), Harvard University (M.B.A.)
- Occupation: CEO of Enjoy
- Known for: Business executive

Ron Johnson (born October 15, 1959) is the former CEO and founder of Enjoy Technology. Previously, he was CEO of JCPenney, where he led a failed effort to fundamentally reshape the retailer; senior vice president of retail operations at Apple Inc., where he developed the concept of the Apple Retail Stores and the Genius Bar; and the vice president of merchandising for Target Corporation, where he was credited for making the store appeal to a younger and trendier crowd. Johnson is on the Board of Directors of Globality Inc, a start-up based in Menlo Park, California.

== Early life and education ==
Johnson was born in Edina, Minnesota, on October 16, 1958, to an executive at General Mills and a homemaker. He was the captain of the Edina High School soccer and baseball teams. Johnson later earned a Bachelor of Art, Economics from Stanford University and an MBA degree from Harvard Business School.

== Career ==
=== Target ===
At Target, Johnson was vice president of merchandising, where he was responsible for launching the Michael Graves line of consumer products.

=== Apple ===
Johnson joined Apple Inc. as senior vice president of retail operations in January 2000. At the suggestion of Millard Drexler (an Apple director and CEO of Gap Inc.), Johnson's retail team and a development team headed by Allen Moyer from The Walt Disney Company began a series of mock-ups for the Apple store in a warehouse near the company's headquarters in Cupertino.

Under Johnson's leadership, Apple's retail stores achieved a record level of growth, exceeding a billion dollars in annual sales within two years of their debut, surpassing the previous record set by the Gap clothing retailer. In 2012, Apple operated more than 400 stores, with outlets in Australia, Canada, China, France, Germany, Italy, Switzerland, United Kingdom, United States, Hong Kong and Japan. According to Fortune "Saks, whose flagship store is down the street, generates sales of $362 per square foot a year. Best Buy stores turn $930–tops for electronics retailers—while Tiffany & Co. takes in $2,666. Audrey Hepburn liked Tiffany's for breakfast, but at $4,032 per square foot, Apple is eating everyone's lunch". In 2011, Apple Stores in the United States had revenue of $473,000 per employee. According to the research firm RetailSails, the Apple Store chain ranked first among U.S. retailers in terms of sales per unit area in 2011, with sales of US$3,085 per square foot, almost double that of Tiffany & Co., the second retailer on the list.

On October 31, 2007, Johnson exercised 700,000 stock options in Apple shares, with a strike price of $23.72, and then sold the stock later that day for $185 to $185.21 apiece, netting him a $112 million profit. It was reported that Johnson earned $400 million during his seven and a half years at Apple.

=== JCPenney ===
After his success at Apple and Target, Johnson was hired as chief executive officer by JCPenney in November 2011, succeeding Mike Ullman, who had been CEO for the preceding seven years. Ullman then was chairman of the board of directors, but was relieved of his duties in January 2013. Bill Ackman, a JCPenney board member and head of hedge fund Pershing Square supported bringing in Johnson to shake up the store's stodgy image and attract new customers. Johnson was given $52.7 million when he joined JCPenney, and he made a $50 million personal investment in the company. After being hired, Johnson tapped Michael Kramer, an Apple Store veteran, as chief operating officer while firing many existing JCPenney executives.

When Johnson announced his transformation vision in late January 2012, J. CPenney's stock rose 24 percent to $43. Johnson's actual execution, however, was described as "one of the most aggressively unsuccessful tenures in retail history". While his rebranding effort was ambitious, he was said to have "had no idea about allocating and conserving resources and core customers. He made promises neither his stores nor his cash flows would allow him to keep". Similar to what he had done at Apple, Johnson did not consider a staged roll-out, instead he "immediately rejected everything existing customers believed about the chain and stuffed it in their faces" with the first major TV ad campaign under his watch. Johnson defended his strategy, saying that "testing would have been impossible because the company needed quick results and that if he hadn’t taken a strong stance against discounting, he would not have been able to get new, stylish brands on board."

Many of the initiatives that were successful at the Apple Stores, for instance the "thought that people would show up in stores because they were fun places to hang out, and that they would buy things listed at full-but-fair price" did not work for the JCPenney brand and ended up alienating its customers who were used to heavy discounting. By eliminating the thrill of pursuing markdowns, the "fair and square every day" pricing strategy disenfranchised JCPenney's traditional customer base. Johnson himself was said "to have a disdain for JCPenney’s traditional customer base." When shoppers were not reacting positively to the disappearance of coupons and sales, Johnson did not blame the new policies. Instead, he offered the assessment that customers needed to be "educated" as to how the new pricing strategy worked. He also likened the coupons beloved by so many core shoppers as drugs that customers needed to be weaned off." While head of JCPenney, Johnson continued to live in California and commuted to work in Plano, Texas by private jet several days a week.

Throughout 2012, sales continued to sag dramatically. In the fourth quarter of the 2012 fiscal year, same-store sales dropped 32%, which led some to call it "the worst quarter in retail history." On April 8, 2013, he was fired as the CEO of JCPenney and replaced by his predecessor, Mike Ullman.

=== Enjoy Technology ===
In 2014, Johnson founded Enjoy, a startup headquartered in Palo Alto, California, that seeks to reinvent the shopping experience. The company raised $30 million in funding, co-led by Kleiner Perkins Caufield Byers and Oak Investment Partners with participation from Andreessen Horowitz. Johnson also committed personal capital to establish the company. The service launched in 2015.

The company went public in 2021, and declared bankruptcy in 2022. Enjoy was sold later in 2022 to Asurion, LLC.

== Author ==
In 2026, Johnson published Shop Different: How Retail Revealed Apple's Genius, co-written with Zander Nethercutt. The book recounts Johnson's role in developing Apple's retail stores and discusses his experiences working with Steve Jobs and his views on retail, leadership, and customer service.

== Personal life ==
As of 2015, Johnson lives in Atherton, California.

Business positions
Preceded by Mike Ullman	CEO of J.C. Penney; November 2011 – April 2013	Succeeded by Mike Ullman
