= Store-within-a-store =

Retail concept

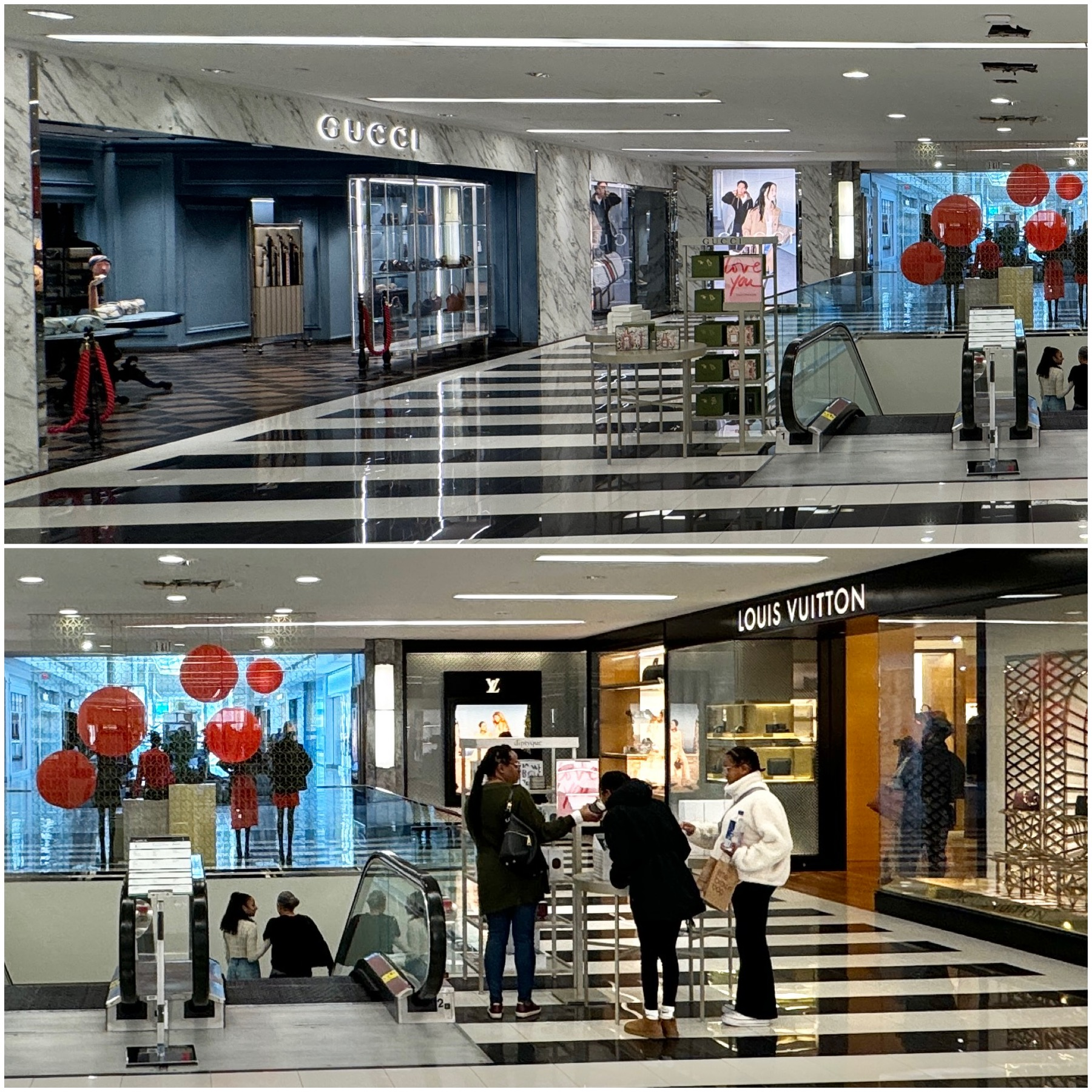
Enclosed stores in Bloomingdale's department store, Tysons Corner Center, Tysons, Virginia, USA

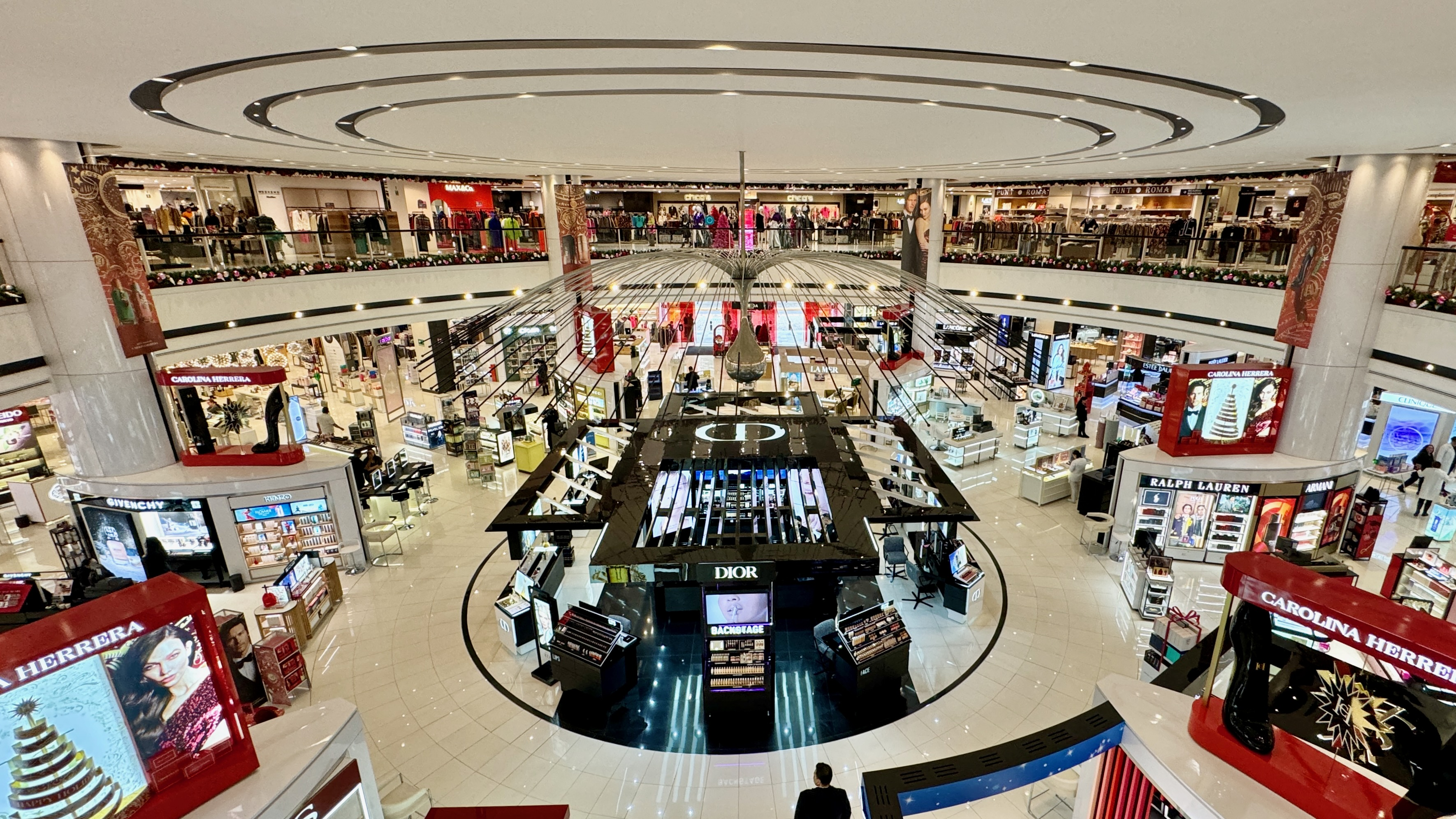
Separate counters by brand: Cosmetics Hall at a Liverpool department store in Mexico City, Mexico

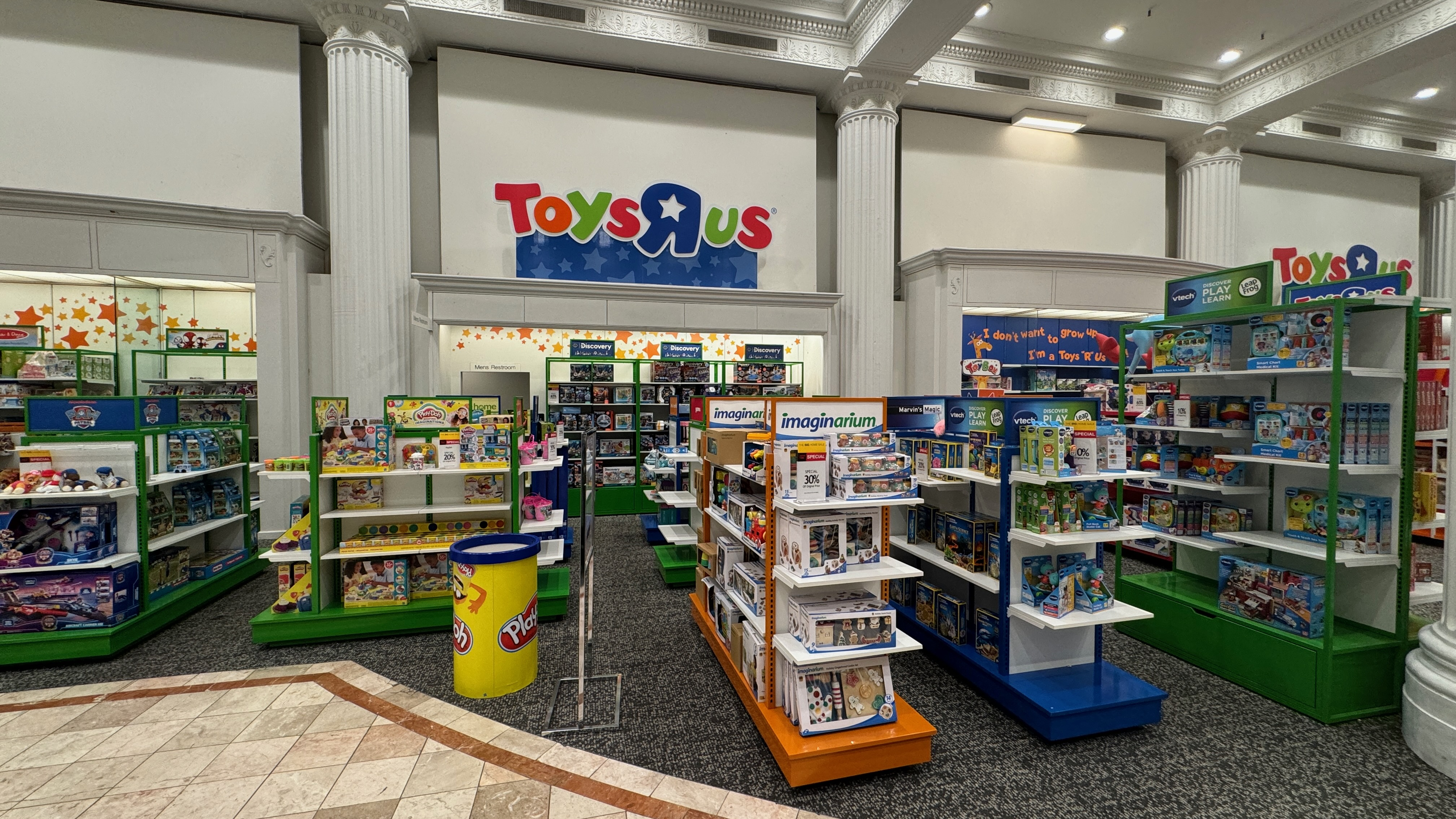
Section of main sales floor: Toys R Us section at Macy's Philadelphia flagship, USA, 2024

A store-within-a-store, also referred to as store-in-store (North America) or shop-in-shop (U.K. et al.), refers to a space within a larger retail store, designated for use by a specific brand to feature its products, clearly branded with signs and other branding elements like color, materials, layout, etc. Such a space may be a section of the main area of the store, or it may have the form of an enclosed store with "walls" and an entrance, much like a store in a shopping mall. Stores-within-stores are particularly common in Europe and Asia.

== Types ==
Varieties of the store-in-store concept include:

- Branded boutiques: Larger retail stores may allocate space for a specific brand to set up a distinct section of their main sales floor or a separate, walled-off boutique with a distinct entrance, within their store. This allows the brand to create a unique and immersive shopping experience for its customers.
- Sub-brands of the same retailer: The store-in-store may be owned and operated by the same retailer, with a sub-brand aiming to create an identity for a department aimed at a specific sub-market or unusual collection of merchandise, such as El Corte Inglés department stores' "Mini Home" area for children's furniture and home decor, or a "Macy's Backstage" discount store-in-store within a Macy's department store.
- Complementary products: Retailers may collaborate with other businesses or brands to showcase complementary products, such as a brand of coffee near the small appliances area where coffeemakers are sold. Or a grocery store chain – whose core business is not serving coffee and food for consumption on premises — may decide to place coffee shops of a certain brand within a number of its locations.
- Pop-Up Shops: Temporary or seasonal setups within a larger store to create customer awareness, to test new markets, and/or to promote specific products for a limited time, such as sunscreen or beachwear in the summer, or a Christmas boutique in the autumn.

== Business model ==
The "store in store" concept allows brands to leverage the existing customer traffic of a larger retail space, while the hosting store benefits from offering a diverse range of products and experiences to its customers. A study by academics from the Wharton School found that the arrangement works because the retailer offers prime locations for which it can charge high rents, the manufacturer makes a higher profit than it would through a wholesale model, and the consumer gets a lower price and better service. The operator of the store-within-a-store can provide these benefits because it receives all profits, instead of having to share them with the retailer, as it would in the traditional split between manufacturer and retailer activities. The study also found that the arrangement works best for relatively non-substitutable goods, like cosmetics and brand fashions.

== By retail format ==
=== In department stores ===
Cosmetics and fragrance departments in department stores are usually in the form of counters dedicated to a single brand.

Flagship high-end department stores such as El Palacio de Hierro Polanco in Mexico City, De Bijenkorf in Amsterdam, and El Corte Inglés Castellana in Madrid dedicate a half-floor or entire floor of their store to branded boutiques of clothing, accessory, cosmetics, and other high-end or luxury brands. Such a large area of individual boutiques has more the appearance of a shopping mall than a traditional department store. Any similarity in procedures and policies versus the main store may be limited to certain functions such as accepting the host store's credit card, keeping the same opening hours, etc. Personnel may be hired by the brand, and then may or may not be employees of the host store, even if they have a security badge issued by the host store. In fact, some department stores such as Illum in Copenhagen, Denmark, have transformed all their space into such boutiques, making them, technically, shopping malls.

More department stores have sections dedicated to brands within the main shopping area of the store. The U.S. department store Bloomingdale's has had such arrangements with Ralph Lauren, Calvin Klein, DKNY and Kenneth Cole, while Neiman Marcus has had them with Armani and Gucci. Former JCPenney CEO Ron Johnson focused on the concept in the 2010s, with Liz Claiborne and Levi's sections in the chain's stores.

=== In discount stores ===
U.S. variety store Five Below which became known for selling products at 5 dollars and under, has been successful up through 2023 with their Five Beyond store-within-a-store concept, which sells items priced above 5 dollars, and expanded it to 400 locations.

=== In supermarkets and hypermarkets ===
In 2022 there were about 6000 Starbucks licensed stores, which included those located inside of supermarkets of the chains Kroger, Hy-Vee and Publix, as well as those inside gas stations, hotels, hospitals and airports.

About 1,800 (as of early 2024) Target hypermarkets (superstores) in the U.S. feature a large section branded as CVS Pharmacy selling medicine and personal care products. CVS had acquired Target's pharmacy business in 2015 for about 1.9 billion USD. Target also has design, creative and store-in-store partnerships with brands like Apple, Disney and Starbucks.

In 2001, Posten Norge, the Norwegian postal service, began to move away from standalone post offices to Post i butikk ('Post in store') stores located in grocery stores.

Some Walmart stores in the US and Canada contain restaurants like Starbucks, McDonald's, Burger King, Auntie Anne's, Mary Brown's, Tim Hortons, Hardee's, A&W, Domino's Pizza, Taco Bell, Papa John's, Little Caesars, Dairy Queen and Subway.

All locations of Loblaws offer PC Mobile via mobile phone kiosks in Loblaws banner stores under the name The Mobile Shop. These stores also offer clothing from Joe Fresh via in-store sections.

Canada Post has in-store Post Offices in Lawton's Drugs (Atlantic Canada), London Drugs, and Shoppers Drug Mart, it's also a service offered in stores owned and operated by The North West Company in Northern Canada.

Some wholesale stores offer in store services, for example Costco Wholesale offers in store Tire Centres, Hearing Aid Centres, Food Courts and Optical Departments.

=== In electronics superstores ===
Apple store within a Best Buy store in Bridgewater, New Jersey, USA, January 2022

Electronics store chains similarly use store-within-a-store concepts. In 1997 under interim CEO Steve Jobs, Apple Computer began a partnership with CompUSA to establish dedicated departments for its products, which would showcase Macintosh computers, software, and accessories, and be staffed by Apple-trained employees and representatives. Apple had phased out its retail agreements with other big box stores in favor of the CompUSA agreement, dissatisfied with their neglect of the products in favor of Microsoft Windows-based PCs with lower margins. Since the early 2010s, Best Buy has extensively used the concept for major vendors such as Apple, Samsung Electronics, Google, and Microsoft (whose agreement called for the entirety of their PC departments to be branded as "the Windows Store", showcasing OEM devices alongside Microsoft hardware such as Surface and Xbox).

=== In drugstores ===
Canada Post has post office locations located in some drug stores.
