= La Vaguada =

Shopping mall in Madrid

Coordinates: 40°28′43″N 3°42′31″W

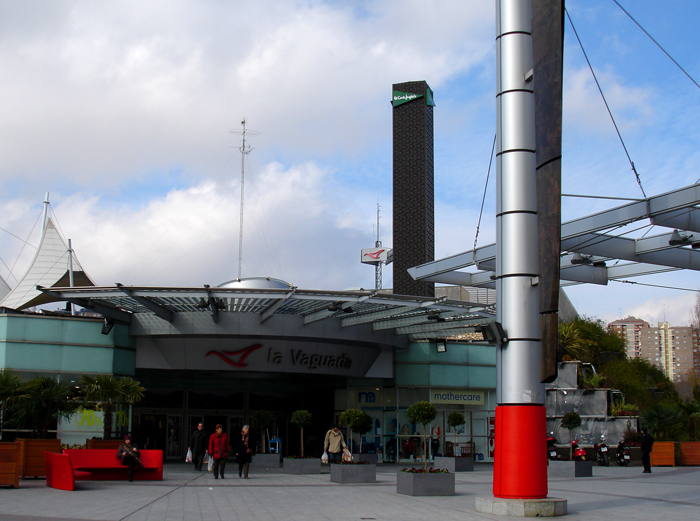
La Vaguada

La Vaguada is a shopping mall located in Madrid, Spain.

== Interior shops ==
There are a variety of shops in La Vaguada. El Corte Inglés, Spain's only department store, Alcampo, inside Alcampo is an EB Games section, Victoria's Secret, The Phone House, Taco Bell, Kentucky Fried Chicken, Vips, GAME, McDonald's.

== Translation ==
The name of this mall means thalweg. La Vaguada is a proper name not a common one. However, this mall was built in a former thalweg.
