= Genius Bar =

Tech support station for Apple retail stores

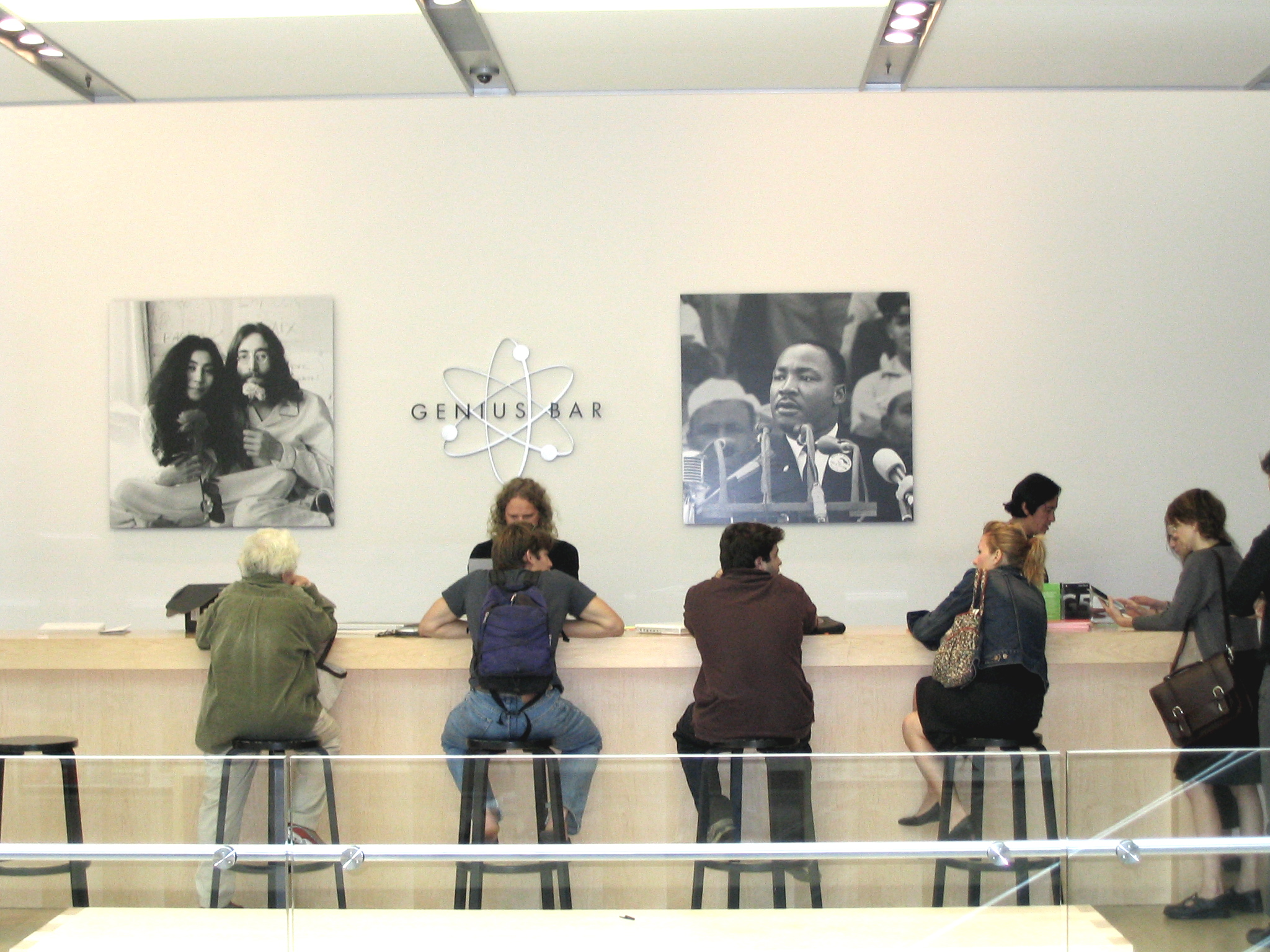
The Genius Bar at the Apple Store in SoHo, New York, in 2003

The Genius Bar is a technical support service provided by Apple inside Apple Stores to support the use of its products and services. The locations provide concierge-style, face-to-face support for customers from "Geniuses" who are specially trained and certified by Apple, with multiple levels of certification depending on the products serviced. For problems that require repairs to hardware, most of the work can be completed on-site, while customers wait.

The Genius Bar at Apple Stores offers same-day service for both screen and lithium-ion battery replacements. If the in-house technician needs to send the affected device to an Apple Repair Center, most repaired or replaced iPhones will be returned or ready for pickup in approximately three days.

Ron Johnson, the former senior vice president for retail, often referred to the Genius Bar as the "heart and soul" of the Apple Store.

Beginning in 2017, numerous Genius Bars were changed to "Genius Groves" with the addition of trees as a part of the "Today at Apple" program.

== Store layout ==
Layouts of a Genius Bar previously consisted of at least two 15- or 17-inch then-current PowerBook or MacBook Pro, often mounted on "floating" stands. Employees now use IPads with similar software to check in machines for repairs. There may be other notebooks for iPod/iPhone troubleshooting, often referred to as "floaters". LCD screens behind the Bar play looped videos which offer tips to customers waiting for help. Stools can be found in front of the Bar for people to sit and chat with each other or with employees.

The "Red Telephone" sometimes seen behind the Genius Bar was a direct line to Apple product specialists, allowing for problems and questions too complicated for the in-store employees to answer. As of August 2009, this phone is no longer installed in newer Apple Retail Stores and removed in others.

== Staff ==
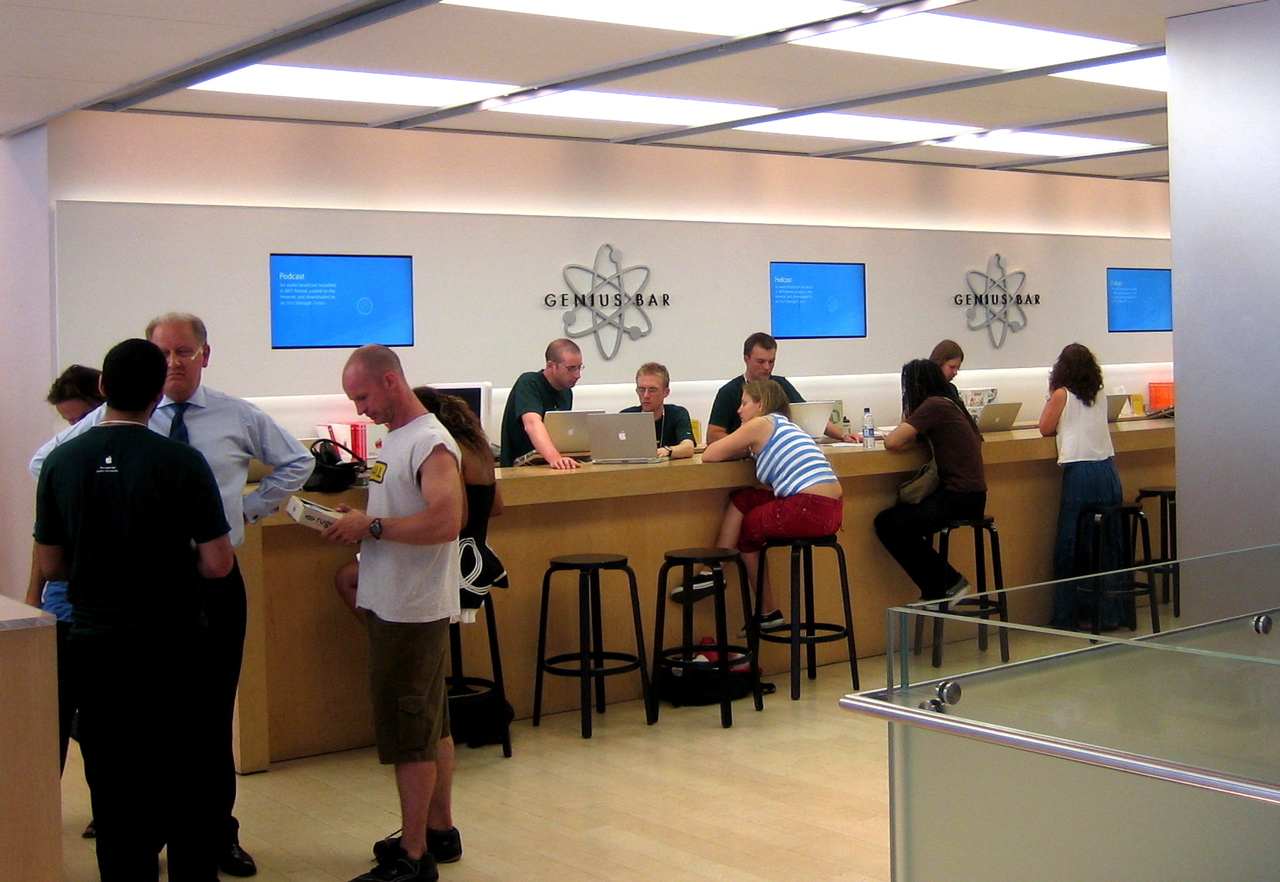
Location in London

The employees can also be viewed as the local representatives of AppleCare+. They offer personal support when customers have problems or questions relating to their Apple products. Most services carried out at the Genius Bar are free. Non-warranty service (which is paid for by the customer when repairs are complete) is also routinely performed. In some countries, Apple has service depots where portable repairs (for issues such as accidental damage) can be completed for a flat rate. Most portable computer repairs and all desktop repairs are performed in-store and completed overnight or within a few days.

In September 2009, the Family Room Specialists were folded into the mix to handle iPod and iPhone troubleshooting. After its release in 2010, iPad appointments also fell under the Family Room Specialists. Apple now maintains two Genius Bar queues: Mac and Mobile Device.

Larger support teams are headed up by the "Lead Genius", who handles customer service issues at the Genius Bar. The Lead Genius is assisted by "Genius Admins", who manage the administrative paperwork, organizing the Geniuses' work and liaising with customers about their repairs.

== Genius Training Student Workbook ==
The Genius Training Student Workbook is Apple's employee training manual for Apple Store tech-support employees, called Geniuses. The manual features various marketing techniques revolving around the end goal of selling merchandise. One of the basic tenets taught to the employees in training is that “Everyone in the Apple Store is in the business of selling”.

The basic selling strategy is summed up with a mnemonic device: Approach, Probe, Present, Listen, End (APPLE). When customers have concerns, the prescribed response in the manual is the "Three Fs:" Feel, Felt, and Found technique. Every Genius must attend a two-week recruit training that mandates programs as diverse as “Using Diagnostic Services” and “The Power of Empathy.” Geniuses also have a list of words that the manual clearly stipulates as banned; words such as "bomb", "crash" and "hang" must be substituted by "does not respond" or "unexpectedly quits". The manual also teaches employees to read emotional cues such as drumming on a table or placing a palm on the back of the neck that might mean a customer is bored or frustrated, respectively. Employees who are not in the Genius role don't receive this manual or go through this training,

The manual was a well-kept secret, until a copy leaked in August 2012 and ended in the hands of Gizmodo's senior staff writer Sam Biddle, who commented: "It’s a penetrating look inside Apple: psychological mastery, banned words, roleplaying—you’ve never seen anything like it." A Christian Science Monitor article connected the manual's contents to the idea of the "reality distortion field", a term for Apple's effectiveness at charming customers.

== Spinoffs/offshoots ==
Currently, Apple offers the Genius Bar for technical support, and has Creatives – software trainers – available at all times to answer less technical questions.

Over the years, Apple has experimented with ways of offering service and support to complement the Genius Bar. Some examples, all now defunct, include:

- The Studio is staffed by "trainers" who serve customers with questions about many Apple consumer and pro applications, such as iLife, iWork, Final Cut Pro, and Aperture. Third party applications are not officially supported.
- The iPod Bar serves to separate out the customers with iPod-related questions to allow the Genius Bar to focus on customers with Macintosh-specific queries.

Pro Labs and Open Lab were introduced with the opening of the Apple Store on West 14th Street in New York City, New York while Pro Labs is also offered at the Sydney, Australia Apple Store and the Pudong, China Apple Store. Open Lab to date is only offered at the West 14th Street location.

- Pro Labs consist of eight hours of training, spread across a series of four two-hour sessions. Much like The Studio, these sessions focus on Apple's "Pro Apps" such as Aperture and Final Cut Pro, as well as other third-party applications such as Photoshop, however, they are much more in-depth and focused than sessions at The Studio.
- Open Lab provides first-come, first-served assistance to customers with various applications, much like the early days of the Genius Bar, but with an emphasis on software as opposed to the Genius Bar's focus on hardware.

Apple has also branded features in their iTunes application "Genius" that make musical suggestions based on the user's observed taste.
