= Freie Strasse =

Street in Basel, Switzerland

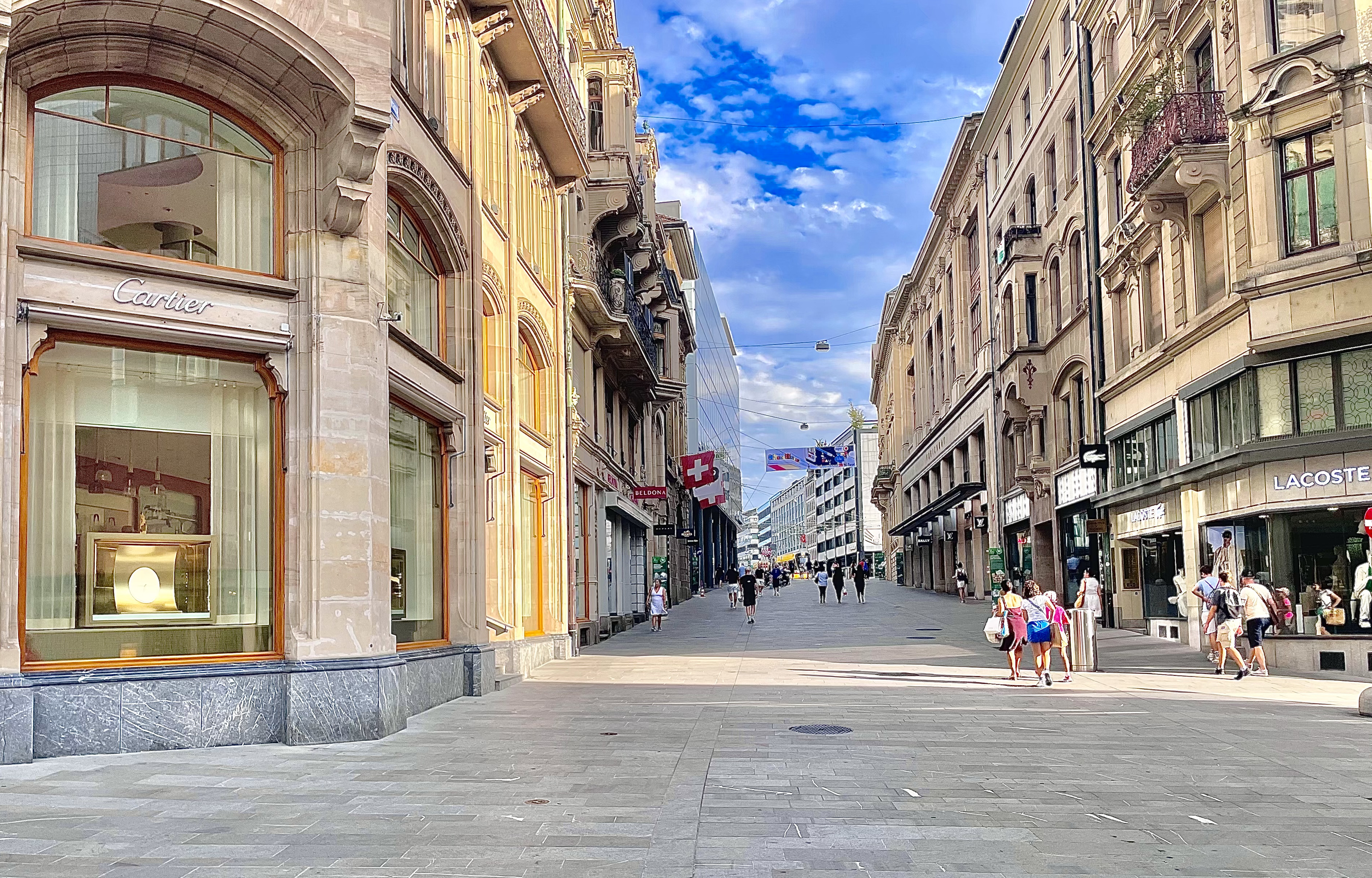
Freie Strasse, Basel (Switzerland)

Freie Strasse is the oldest shopping street in the city of Basel, Switzerland. It was already used as a transportation and trade route towards the west during the time of the Roman settlement in Augusta Raurica around 44 BC. Today, it is considered one of the most important shopping streets in the city.

== Location ==
The street is located in the center of the city of Basel. It leads directly from the tram junction called "Bankverein" (named after the former headquarters of the Swiss Bank Corporation) to the Marketplace and the Basel Town Hall. The street runs parallel to the Birsig river as well as to Münsterplatz, and it is connected to it in the north by the "Münsterberg." In the southern direction, there are two connections to Barfüsserplatz, namely the "Streitgasse" and the "Kaufhausgasse."

== Name ==
The name of the street is documented for the first time in the year 1241 as "libera strata," while its official designation occurred only in the year 1861. The "Freie Strasse" is also the first connection referred to as a "street" in the old town of Basel, where traditionally the terms "Gasse" (alley) or "Berg" (mountain) were prevalent. The name may possibly be explained by the fact that no road tolls were allowed to be imposed on the street by the Bishop of Basel, which in turn contributed to the continuous growth of the economic development that had already been influential since Roman times.

== History ==
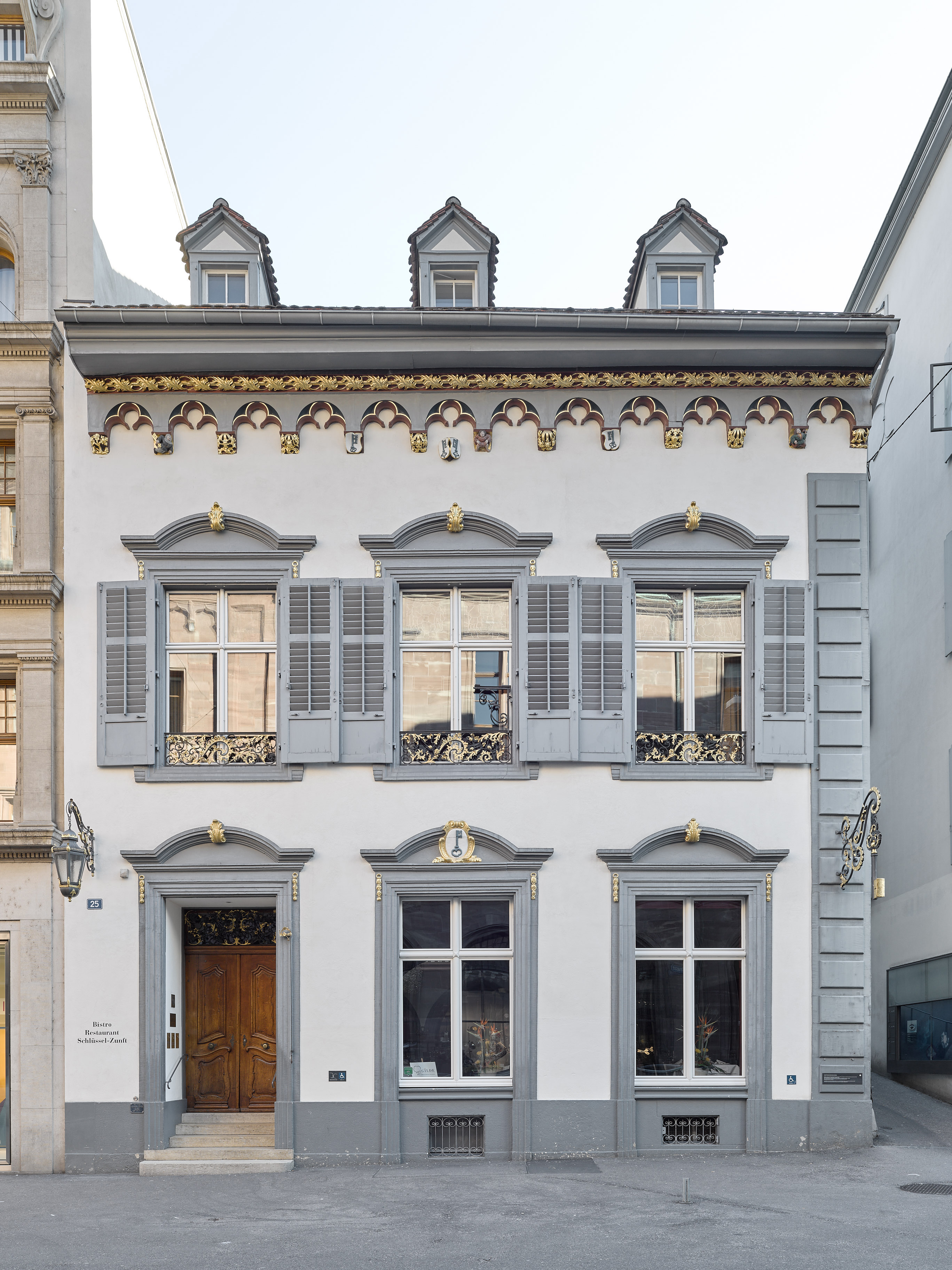
''Haus zum Schlüssel'' from 1488, one of the oldest guild headquarters in the city

The street was already used as a trade route heading west (towards present-day Kembs in France) during the time of the Roman colony Augusta Raurica (located about ten kilometers east of Basel's current city center). It subsequently developed into the most significant trade and transport route of the region and maintained this status even after the decline of the Roman colony. When Basel became the most important urban settlement of the region in the 7th century, the significance of the street grew once again.

With the later construction of the Middle Bridge (1225) and the opening of the Gotthard Pass (1200), the trade volume of the street increased significantly once more. The street then became the center of the city's guilds, which often erected representative buildings here (the most prominent remaining example of this today being the headquarters of the ''Schlüsselzunft'' in the lower part of the street). Between the years 1376 and 1378, the so-called "Kaufhaus" (shopping hall) was opened on the street, quickly becoming the most important trade and transshipment center for goods from around the world in the city and remaining a prominent feature of the street's landscape until the construction of the "Hauptpost" (main post office) in 1853. In the following centuries, the street also became a popular residential area for many aspiring families of the Basel bourgeoisie.

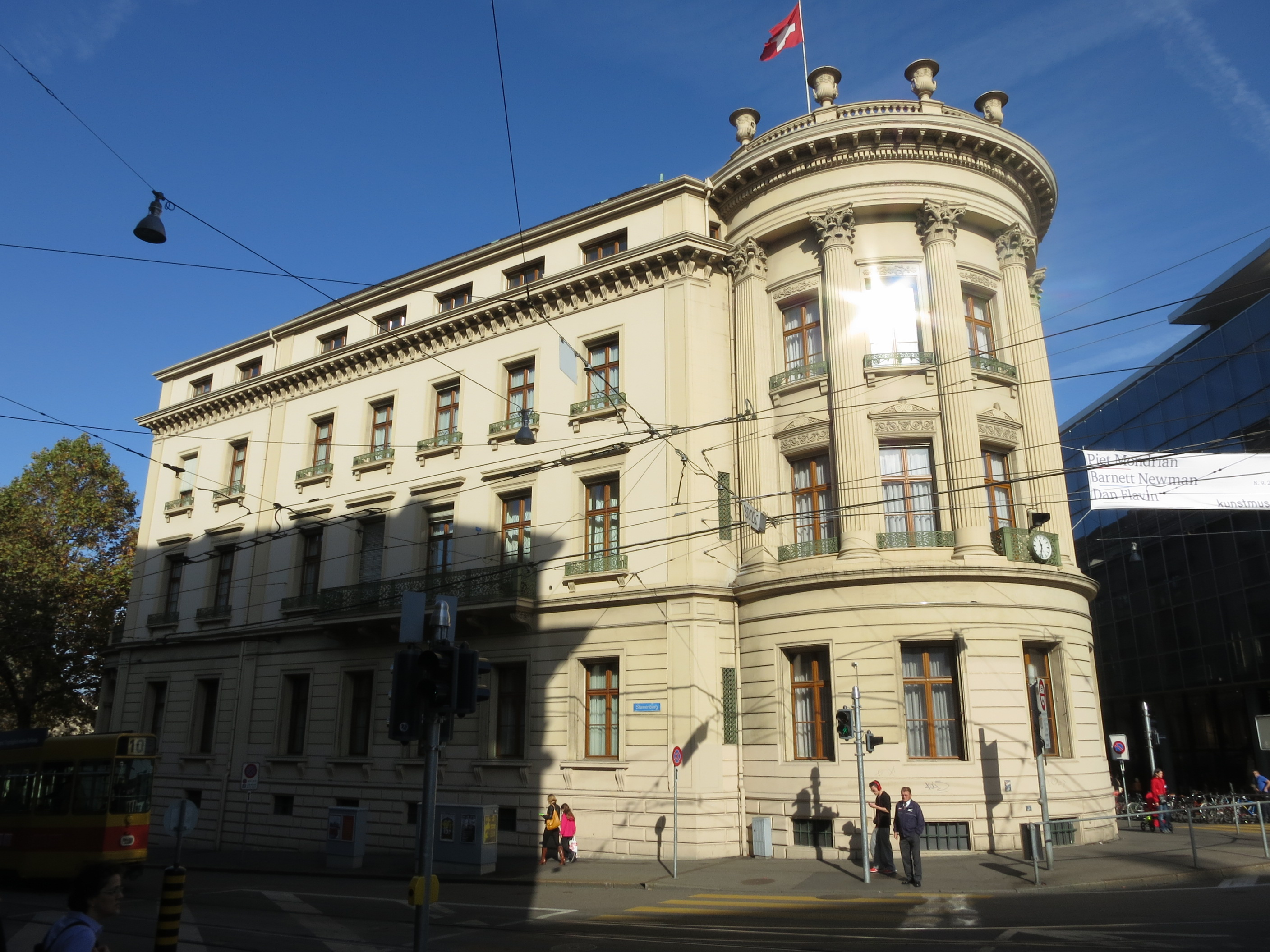
''Schilthof'' from 1840, which was modelled after the Temple of Vesta in the Roman Forum

From the mid-19th century onward, the street underwent renovation, expansion, and significant architectural changes as part of Basel's overall urban development following the principles of contemporary European urban planning considered modern at that time. Several construction phases were undertaken to achieve this transformation. For instance, at the upper entrance of the street, the neoclassical "Schilthof" (1840) was built under the guidance of Johann Jakob Stehlin the Elder. This grand building, modeled after the Temple of Vesta in the Roman Forum, featured multi-story Corinthian pilasters and was intended to reflect the elevated representative aspirations of the bourgeois class.

In 1851, the task of creating an impressive building to replace the old "Kaufhaus" (shopping hall) was entrusted to the Basel architect Johann Jakob Stehlin the Younger. This new building was intended for the recently established Swiss Post, which had been founded just two years prior. The Basel Main Post Office thus became one of the first prestige buildings of the newly formed state corporation in Switzerland. In 1881, it was extended up to the "Rüdengasse" by the Viennese architect Friedrich von Schmidt.

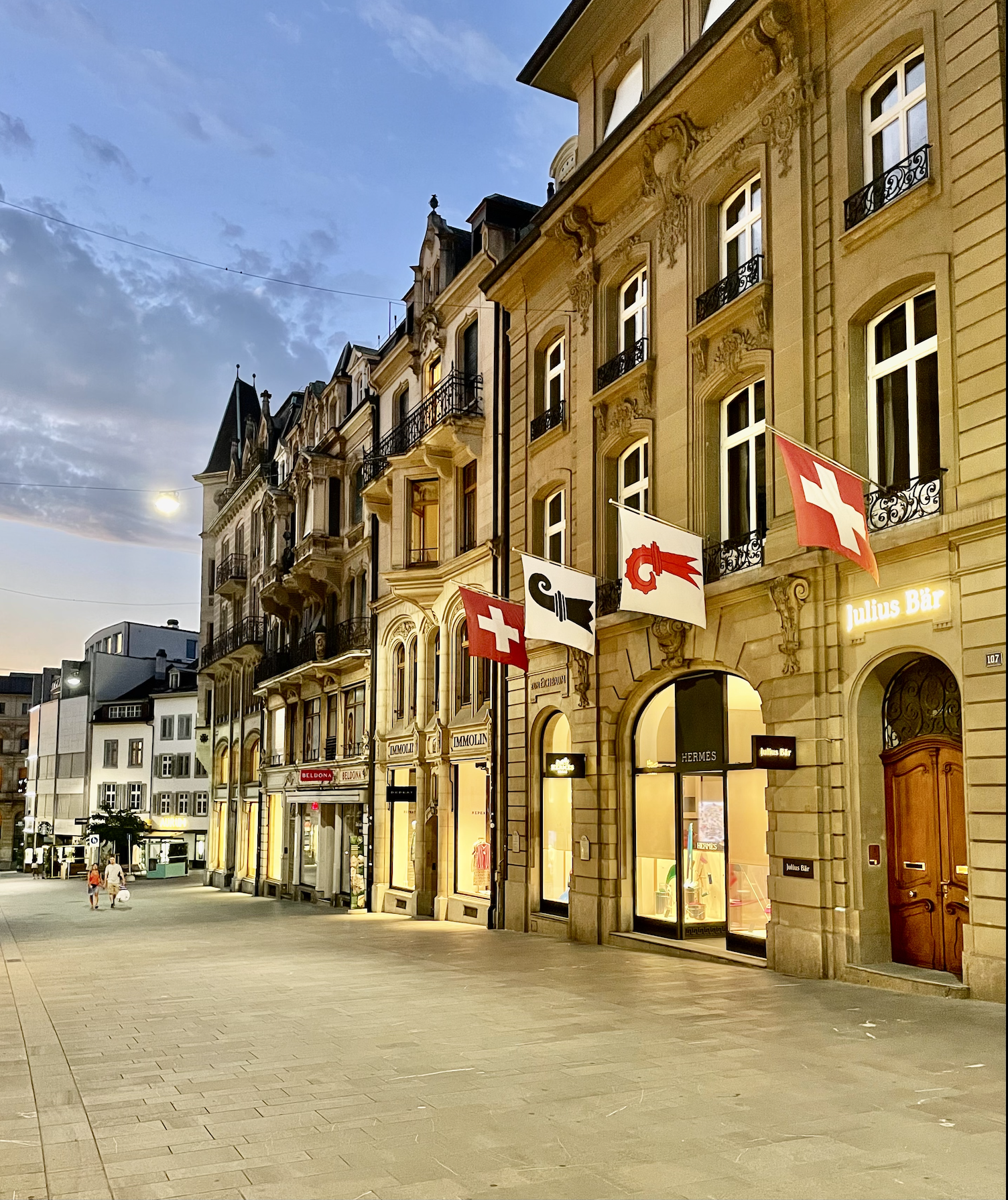
Upper part of the street with urban mansions after the street ''correction'' of 1895

Over the following decades, the street was repeatedly widened. For instance, in 1895, an "adjustment" was made in the upper part of the street, characterized by an elegant architecture of small townhouses following the aesthetics and standards of the Belle Époque. The architectural design of these townhouses, often featuring large display windows, embraced a variety of styles. These ranged from Neobaroque and Neo-Gothic to later developments like Art Nouveau, and were typically executed by the leading architectural firms of the city.

In the 20th century, the appearance of the street underwent further changes, particularly due to a notable number of new buildings that emerged in the second half of the century, some of which sparked significant controversies. Among the most well-known examples of the street's architectural transformation is the construction of the "Sodeck" commercial building by Marcus Diener in 1978, which replaced a representative building in the Historicist style from 1898 designed by Rudolf Linder and Vischer van Gaasbeck. The character of the street changed once again due to motorized traffic, which had a strong influence on the overall development of the city.

Starting in 2020, the street was closed to general motorized individual traffic following a decision by the Great Council of Basel-City. The street was entirely paved with Alpnach quartzite stones (from the Canton of Obwalden), eliminating the previous distinction between sidewalks and the road itself.
