= Sales per unit area =

In retail, sales per unit area is a standard and usually the primary measurement of store success. The unit of area is usually square metres in the metric system or square feet in U.S. customary units. Square feet are also widely used in retailing in the United Kingdom, but there are signs of a trend towards use of square meters.

== Sales levels in the United States ==
As of 2005 annual store sales in the range of $300 per square foot ($3,000/m^{2}) is considered a respectable result in the United States as the national average for regional malls is $341 per square foot, but the target number depends on the location, the type of store and other factors. For example, the Forum Shops at Caesars Palace in Las Vegas sets a precedent for Las Vegas stores. The location has the second highest sales per square foot of any mall in the nation at approximately $1,300 per square foot (Bal Harbour Shops is first with over $2,500 per square foot). The average for specialty apparel retailers, for instance, is $400 per square foot ($4,400/m^{2}), and according to Baseline Magazine the retailer Hot Topic achieves an annual $619 per square foot ($6,660/m^{2}).

According to industry research firm RetailSails, Apple has the highest sales per square foot, with average in all their stores of $6,050 per square foot annually.

Among shopping mall retailers the food court area, considered as a single store, and jewelers post the highest sales per unit area, in the range of $600 per square foot ($6,600/m^{2}). Books and sporting goods are among the lowest.
