= List of awards and nominations received by Jony Ive =

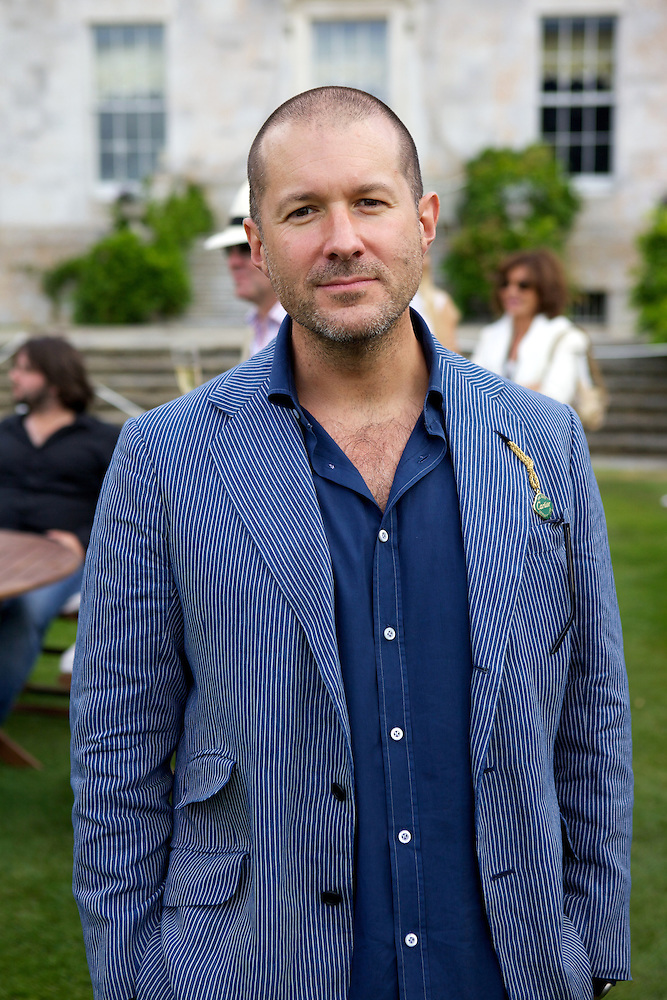
Designer Jony Ive at the 2010 Goodwood Festival of Speed automobile show

The industrial designer Jony Ive has received awards and nominations for his work and product suits' at the design teams of Tangerine and Apple.

== Honors and awards ==
- In 1999, Ive was named by the MIT Technology Review TR100 one of the top 100 innovators in the world under age 35.
- In 2003, he was the winner of the Design Museum's Designer of the Year Award, the first given.
- In 2003, he was appointed a Royal Designer for Industry (RDI).
- In 2004, he received the RSA Benjamin Franklin Medal.
- In 2004, he was named the "Most Influential Person on British Culture" in a BBC poll of cultural writers.
- In 2005, Ive was awarded the D&AD's annual President's Award for Outstanding Contribution to the Industry, which recognises a design industry hero.
- In 2005, The Sunday Times named Ive one of Britain's most influential expatriates, saying: "Ive may not be the richest or the most senior figure on the list, but he has certainly been one of the most influential as the man who designed the iPod."
- A 2006, Macworld magazine poll listed Ive's joining Apple in 1992 as the sixth most significant event in Apple's history, while Dan Moren, a writer at MacUser magazine (a subsidiary of Macworld), suggested in March 2006 that, when the time came for Steve Jobs to step down as the CEO of Apple, Ive would be an excellent candidate for the position, justifying the statement by saying that Ive "embodies what Apple is perhaps most famous for: design". However, Jobs was succeeded by Tim Cook, the company's former COO.
- In 2006, he was also appointed as an Honorary Fellow of the Royal Academy of Engineering (HonFREng).
- In 2007, Ive was awarded an honorary doctorate from the University of the Arts London.
- In 2007, the UK edition of GQ named Ive "Product Designer of the Year".
- In 2007, Ive received the 2007 National Design Award in the product-design category for his work on the iPhone.
- In 2008, Ive was awarded an honorary doctorate from the University of Gothenburg.
- In 2008, he was named the No. 1 "Most Influential Briton in America" by the Daily Telegraph. Creativity Online included Ive in their "Creativity 50" list. The same year, he was awarded the MDA Personal Achievement Award for the design of the iPhone.
- In 2009, Ive received an honorary doctorate from the Rhode Island School of Design, and was made an honorary doctor of the Royal College of Art. Also in 2009, Fast Company put him at No. 1 on their list of "100 Most Creative People in Business; the Daily Telegraph named him the second "Most Influential Briton in Technology, Forbes magazine listed him as second amongst the "Most Powerful People in Technology; and The Guardian named him "Inventor of the Decade".
- In 2010, Bloomberg BusinessWeek listed Ive among the "World's Most Influential Designers", CNN Money named him "Smartest Designer" in their "Smartest People in Tech" story. Ive was listed at No. 18 on "The Vanity Fair 100" list, and Eureka of The Times group placed him No. 5 on their list of "Britain's Most Important Scientists"; Fortune named Ive the "world's smartest designer" for his work on Apple products.
- Fortune stated in 2010 that Apple design motifs Ive's designs have "set the course not just for Apple but for design more broadly".
- In 2012, Ive's Apple design team was awarded the best design studio and best brand of the past 50 years at a ceremony marking the 50th anniversary of D&AD.
- In 2012, Ive was listed as the number one in Wired's innovator and influencer list.
- In 2012, Ive was named by the UK's Intellectual Property Office as its British Visionary Innovator for that year.
- In 2012, Ive was among the British cultural icons selected by artist Sir Peter Blake to appear in a new version of his most famous artwork – the Beatles' Sgt. Pepper's Lonely Hearts Club Band album cover – to celebrate the British cultural figures of his life that he most admires.
- In 2012, Vanity Fair gave Ive along with Tim Cook the first spot on their annual "New Establishment" List.
- In 2013, the BBC's Blue Peter awarded Ive a gold Blue Peter badge and he was then profiled by Bono in The 2013 TIME annual list of the 100 most influential people in the world.
- Ive was appointed a Commander of the Order of the British Empire (CBE) in the 2006 New Year Honours for "services to the design industry". In the 2012 New Year Honours, he was promoted to Knight Commander of the same Order (KBE) for "services to design and enterprise"; he was knighted by Princess Anne at Buckingham Palace in a May 2012 ceremony. He described the honour as "absolutely thrilling" and said he was "both humbled and sincerely grateful".
- In 2014, Ive was awarded the Design Award from the San Francisco Museum of Modern Art, the first designer to receive it.
- As of 2015, Ive holds almost 5,000 patents to his name.
- On successive Wednesdays in June 2016, Ive was awarded honorary Doctor of Science degrees at the University of Cambridge and the University of Oxford.
- In November 2016, Ive was elected as an Honorary Fellow of Jesus College, Cambridge.
- In 2017, Ive was the recipient of Smithsonian's American Ingenuity Award for Technology.
- In 2018, Ive was awarded the Professor Hawking Fellowship by the Cambridge Union Society in the University of Cambridge.
- In 2021, Ive was awarded an honorary doctorate from the California College of the Arts.
- In 2022, Ive was awarded The Wall Street Journal's Innovator Award.
- In 2023, Ive was awarded the Edison Achievement Award by Edison Awards.

== See also ==
- Apple Inc. design motifs
- Apple Industrial Design Group
- List of English inventors and designers
