= Beats Pill =

Portable speaker

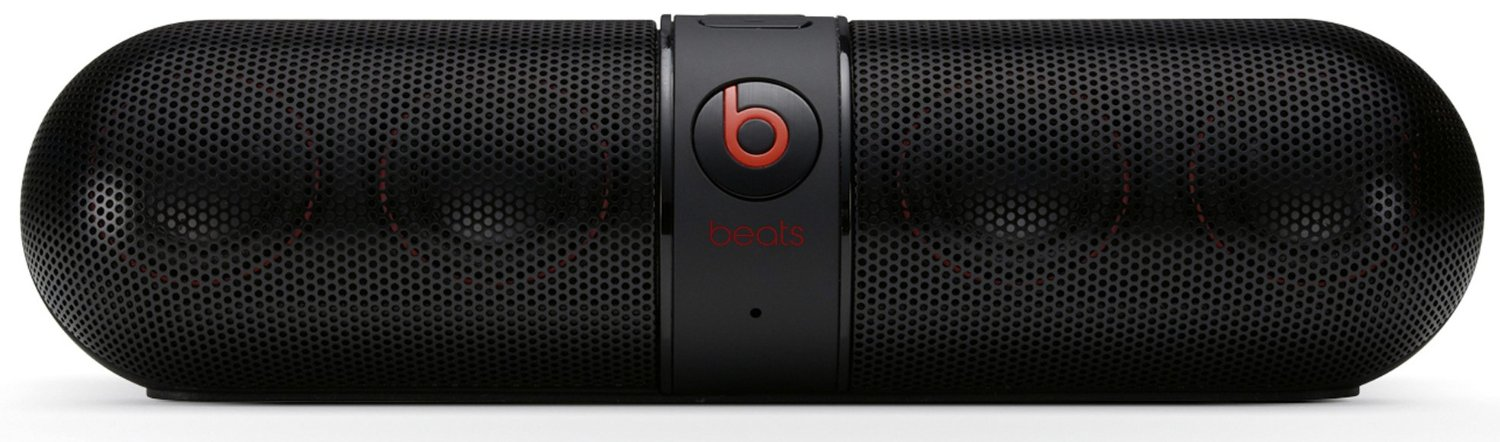
- Beats Pill Black N2
- Developer: Apple Inc.(since 2014)
- Manufacturer: Beats Electronics
- Type: Wireless speaker
- Input: 3.5 mm audio input Apple Lightning (Pill+ Only); USB-C (2024 Pill)
- Connectivity: Bluetooth
- Successor: HomePod

Beats Pill is a line of portable Bluetooth speakers produced by Beats Electronics, a subsidiary of Apple Inc. The speakers are characterized primarily by their capsule-like form factor. Several Pill models have been released since the original launch in 2012, with the most recent version released in 2024.

The original model received mixed reviews, with critics praising its industrial design and ease-of-use, but believing that its sound quality was lacking in the low end, and was not high enough to justify the product's price. The updated Beats Pill+ model received more positive reviews, with critics believing that it had cleaner and more balanced audio, albeit still lacking in overall power output.

== Design and functionality ==
Serving as one of the company's first self-developed products after the end of its exclusive manufacturing deal with Monster Cable Products, the Beats Pill was designed by Robert Brunner's studio Ammunition Design Group, and carries a capsule-based design roughly 7.7 inches (20 cm) in length. Its appearance is characterized by curved surfaces and a gloss finish. The speaker contains minimal controls; the logo serves as a multi-purpose button for starting and stopping tracks, and the only other buttons are volume keys and the power button.

The Pill uses Bluetooth and supports near-field communication for device pairing. It also includes 3.5mm audio input and output jacks. The Pill charges over a Micro USB port, and comes with a USB AC adapter. The device also includes a microphone so it can be used as a speakerphone. The Pill is also an aptX-certified device. In 2013, updated versions of the Pill, Beats Pill 2.0, were released. The new models have longer battery life, a port for charging other USB devices, the ability to pair Pills together with near-field communication (NFC) to play the same audio either individually, or handling left and right stereo channels respectively, character stands, and a new, larger "XL" version.

On June 3, 2015, Beats voluntarily recalled all Pill XL models, citing that in rare cases, the battery may overheat and combust.

=== Beats Pill+ ===
The Beats Pill+ was unveiled in October 2015, as the first revision to the product released under Apple Inc. ownership. The Pill+ is slightly larger than the previous model, and carries a refreshed design with top-mounted volume controls and a Beats logo button. The Pill's speaker hardware was redesigned to improve sound quality. The Pill+ uses Apple's Lightning connector instead of USB, and can charge supported iOS products from its battery—which has an increased capacity rated for 12 hours of use on a single charge. The Pill+ has a companion mobile app for iOS and Android devices, used for pairing speakers together (in place of NFC), and allowing multiple users to alternate playing music on a single Pill ("DJ mode").

=== 2024 model ===
A new Beats Pill model was unveiled and released in June 2024; its design is similar to previous models, but with improved audio hardware and upward angled drivers, IP67 certification, a lanyard for carrying the speaker, and battery capacity rated at 24 hours of use. The new model uses USB-C for charging, and also supports lossless audio input over USB-C.

== Marketing ==
Playing off its design, initial marketing for the Pill used the tagline "Just what the doctor ordered". As with other Beats products, the Pill was promoted primarily through celebrity endorsements, and product placements in music videos. A pink model was released in 2013 as part of a collaboration with Nicki Minaj.

A commercial for the Beats Pill starred Robin Thicke and Pharrell Williams; reprising their music video for "Blurred Lines", it featured scenes of female dancers suggestively using the speakers as a prop. The United Kingdom's Advertising Standards Authority received 97 complaints over the ad, alleging that it contained sexually suggestive imagery. The ASA ruled in October 2013 that "taken as a whole, the ad did not show sustained, overtly sexual or provocative behaviour". However, it did deem the advert to be inappropriate for airing before 7:30 p.m.

Another campaign featuring anthropomorphic versions of the speakers debuted during the 2013 MTV Video Music Awards, which were voiced by musicians such as Chris Rock, Eminem, and Tichina Arnold. Subsequent commercials included references to events that occurred during the ceremony, such as Miley Cyrus's controversial "We Can't Stop" performance, and one where Siri refuses to invite the characters to attend a party being held by Dr. Dre to celebrate the company's sale to Apple.

The 2014 film Transformers: Age of Extinction features a product placement where the character Joshua Joyce turns programmable matter into the Pill and offers it to another character; the marketing news website Brandchannel named it the worst product placement of 2014.

== Reception ==
The Beats Pill was met with mixed reviews; while praise was received for its hardware design, ease-of-use, and the levels of volume it could produce, the Pill was primarily criticized for its audio quality and price. PC Magazine in particular criticized its handling of bass, concluding that it "offers a unique form factor and doubles as a good speakerphone, but it simply doesn't offer good enough sound quality to justify its $200 price tag. While you might get a reasonably loud and clear listening experience on one track, the next might pop distractingly and force you to tweak the volume just because it has slightly more bass." Wired felt that the Pill's difficulty with bass was in contrast to the focus on the low end that had been emphasized by the Beats by Dr. Dre headphones.

CNET was similarly mixed, noting unique features such as its "striking design", NFC support, the ability to serve as a pass-through device for other audio systems, and its "relatively detailed sound (notice the use of the word 'relatively') with respectable bass compared with other tiny speakers in its class." It was originally given a score of 3.5 out of 5, but this was later revised to 3.0, citing the availability of competing speakers with identical or better audio quality at a lower price.

In a brief demo, The Verge felt that the Pill+ was "the most attractive-looking and sounding speaker that Beats has ever made", noticing that its design refinements felt influenced by Apple's corporate hardware design language, and that in terms of audio quality, "for lack of a better way to describe it, there was space in between all the sounds coming out of the speaker, whereas most others tend to crush all the different frequencies together." PC Magazine felt that the Pill+ offered a "clean, well-defined, balanced listening experience", but that since their drivers were not angled upward, "you miss much of the definition the tweeters bring to the table unless they happen to be lined up with your ears." It was argued that the Pill+ was lacking in "power and bass depth" for its price point, but that its "clean audio delivery" made up for it.

The Verge was positive on the 2024 model, assessing that it was "clear, can crank fairly loud, and is tuned well for today's chart toppers", and "sounds perfectly good" in most casual scenarios. In conclusion, it was assessed that the new Pill was more than competitive" in its US$150 price range, and that "there's really not much to dislike about the remastered Beats Pill if you can get past its mono output."

== See also ==
- Loudspeaker enclosure
