= Make Something Wonderful =

Biographical work on Steve Jobs

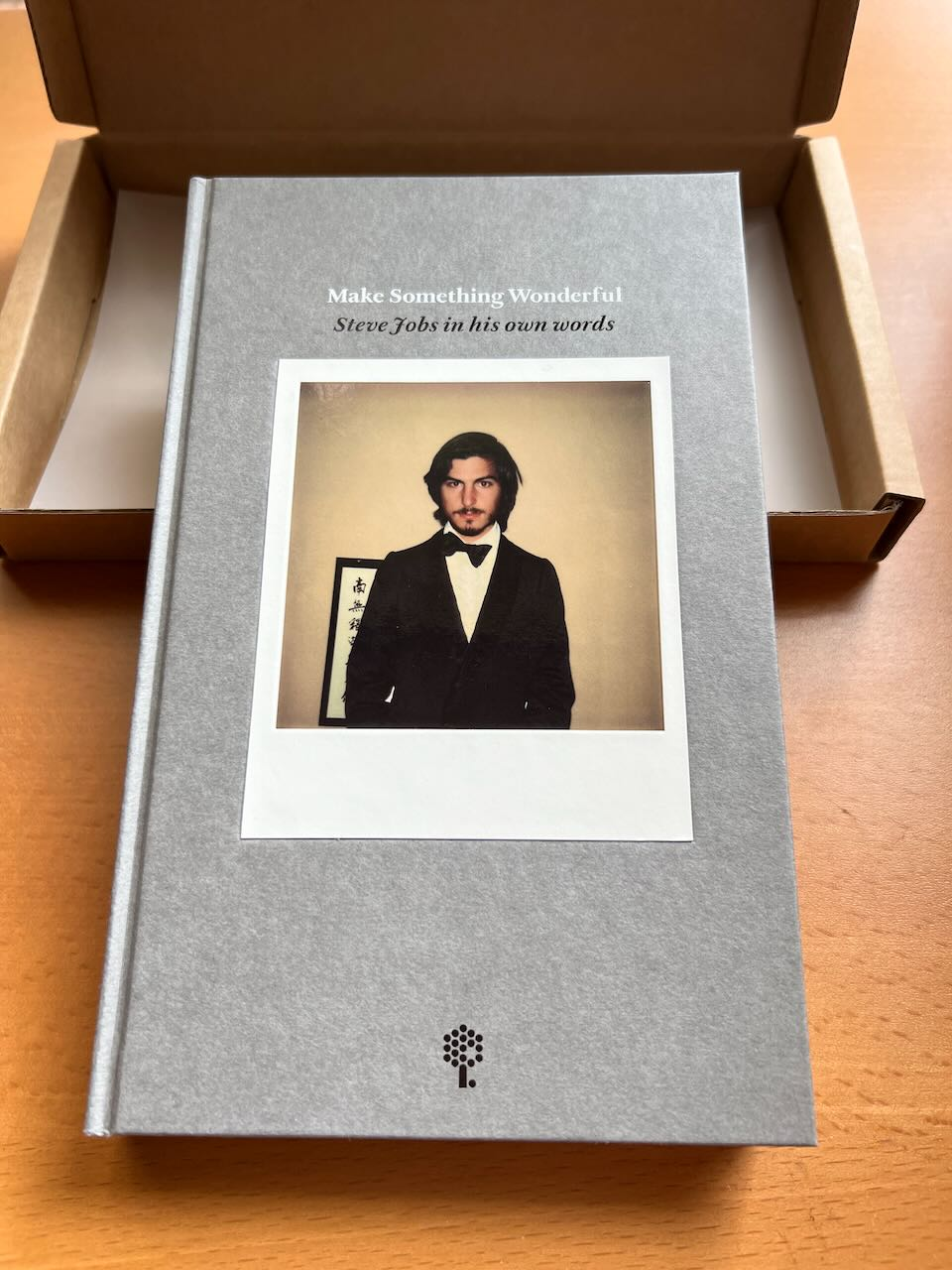
- Editor: Leslie Berlin
- Author: Compiled by family, friends and former colleagues of Steve Jobs
- Language: English
- Genre: Non-fiction, Biography
- Publisher: Steve Jobs Archive
- Publication date: April 11, 2023
- Publication place: United States
- Media type: E-book
- Pages: 250
- Website: https://book.stevejobsarchive.com/

Make Something Wonderful is a posthumous collection of Steve Jobs' words, released more than 11 years after the Apple co-founder's death. Compiled by a small group of family, friends, and former colleagues, the book offers an intimate view of Jobs' life and thoughts through his notes, drafts, letters, speeches, oral histories, interviews, photos, and mementos. It is published by the Steve Jobs Archive, and available for free online and on Apple Books.

The book was edited by Leslie Berlin. It was designed by LoveFrom, a firm founded by Jony Ive, Apple's former chief design officer, with a minimalist gray and white aesthetic that reflects Apple's signature style. Laurene Powell Jobs, Steve Jobs' wife of 20 years, wanted people to directly experience her husband's writing and work without any intermediary.

Tim Cook, Apple's CEO, distributed a hardcover copy of the book to Apple employees as a reminder of the company's purpose to create products that enrich lives and leave the world a better place. According to Powell Jobs, the book serves as a warning to ground technology in humanity during a time when AI is causing societal upheaval and ethical debates. Disney CEO Bob Iger, a friend of Jobs who acquired Jobs' Pixar, also distributed a hardcover copy to Disney employees.

The 250-page book, which grew from an initial 40-page pamphlet, features previously unpublished photos and focuses on Jobs' "inner thoughts, philosophies, and mantras" more than his business decisions or corporate leadership. Its content, ordered chronologically, offers an intimate view of Jobs' life, showcasing his desire to "give back his knowledge and nurture younger people", most evident in his commencement speeches.

Make Something Wonderful is part of the Steve Jobs Archive's stated goal of preserving Jobs' legacy, and providing a rare intimate glimpse into Jobs' thoughts.
