= Apple Industrial Design Group =

Industrial design arm of Apple

The Apple Industrial Design Group is the industrial design department within Apple, responsible for creating the physical appearance of all Apple products. The group was established so that Apple could design products in-house, rather than relying on external design firms.

The group traces its origins to 1977, when Steve Jobs hired Jerry Manock to design the Apple II housing. In the early 1980s, Apple contracted Hartmut Esslinger and frog design to develop the Snow White design language, which defined Apple's visual identity for much of the decade. By the early 1990s, Apple brought all industrial design fully in-house under the direction of Robert Brunner, who oversaw a transition away from the Snow White language toward new design approaches such as the Espresso language.

Following the return of Steve Jobs in 1997, Jony Ive was appointed to lead the group and became one of the most prominent industrial designers in the technology industry. Under Ive's direction, Apple introduced a succession of influential designs, including the iMac, iPod, iPhone, and iPad. Ive departed Apple in 2019 to found the design studio LoveFrom. Subsequently, Evans Hankey led the hardware design team until her departure in 2023, after which Molly Anderson became the industrial design leader.

== History ==
Apple Industrial Design was established in April 1977 when Steve Jobs hired Jerry Manock to design the Apple II housing. Jobs focused on design and style, looking to consumer appliances at Macy's for inspiration. Jobs and Manock set about establishing the design language that Apple used throughout the early years of the company.

In addition to the Apple II, Manock came to manage Apple Design Guild which consisted of a loose band of in-house designers, among them Bill Dresselhaus responsible for the Lisa and Rob Gemmell responsible for the Apple IIe and Apple IIc. It was from this group that a project called "Snow White" emerged. The importance that Jobs put on appearance led to a desire to begin the search for a "world-class" designer or design team to give Apple a unique and uniform design language. It was Manock's suggestion that it be made a contest. The company proceeded to solicit designers from the pages of magazines.

=== Frog Design ===
Hartmut Esslinger and his team at Frog Design came to Apple through this contest and created a design language that took the project's code name, contributing to a unified corporate visual identity for Apple. Though Esslinger originally created a design for the Macintosh, it wasn't until the Apple IIc, designed with Rob Gemmell, that Apple would first introduce the new design language. From the introduction of the Apple II through the Macintosh Plus, Apple's products favored a beige-like color scheme of differing shades. The Apple IIc was the first to introduce a product with a lighter, creamy off-white color, known in-house as "Fog" (though Esslinger originally argued for bright white), a color that would persist in all Snow White design language products until the introduction of the Apple IIGS in late 1986, which marked a turning point in the unification of Apple products. Apple selected a warm gray color they called "Platinum" for the IIGS and all subsequent desktop computers until the introduction of the iMac in 1998. (A dark gray color was adopted for the PowerBook line of laptops and its peripherals).

The original Macintosh was designed by Jerry Manock and Terry Oyama with guidance from Steve Jobs. In doing so, they created a design that became central to the visual identity of the Macintosh line. Elements of the original Macintosh design influenced subsequent models, from the "Snow White" updates like the Macintosh SE to the translucent casing of the iMac. Having worked 90-hour weeks, Manock and the rest of the Mac team were exhausted, and he failed to register the Macintoshes in time for the design award consideration. Esslinger would not make the same mistake with the SE and ultimately received the recognition denied Manock, which often led to Esslinger being credited with the original design of the Macintosh, a perception Esslinger and Frog Design always corrected. However, by the end of 1985, Steve Jobs resigned from Apple and Hartmut Esslinger and his Frog Design team followed, later working with Jobs at NeXT.

=== Reformation ===
By the early 1990s, Apple discovered that the Snow White language was being copied by generic IBM PC competitors. With the move away from Frog Design, Apple chose to bring all industrial design in-house by creating the Apple Industrial Design Group, headed by Robert Brunner except for portable computer devices design projects led by Kazuo Kawasaki. Though many of the new designs reflected the legacy of Esslinger's Snow White language, the new design group began to move away from it, visible in products using the Espresso design language such as the Macintosh Color Classic. Snow White's features, like deep grooves into the plastic, did not fit the scale of mobile products. Espresso would feature symmetry, darker colors, and more curves.

=== Return of Steve Jobs ===
Following the return of Steve Jobs in 1997, designer Jony Ive was appointed senior vice president of industrial design. Under his leadership, the group's designs incorporated bold colors, translucent plastics, and elements influenced by Dieter Rams' design philosophy for Braun.) The launch of the iMac in 1998 revisited the all-in-one format and top-mounted handle configuration of the original Macintosh.

The successive design language adopted by Apple can be split into two aspects: a white or black color scheme, usually with a glossy texture and plastic cases; and a bead blasted aluminum and glass look. The former was exclusively used for consumer products, such as the MacBook and iPod, while the latter was mainly used in professional products such as the MacBook Pro and Mac Pro. However, more recent revisions of the iMac, iPad, iPhone, and iPod lines have adopted the aluminum of the professional line with sleek black elements. Apple developed a unibody milling process to manufacture contoured aluminum casings. Both design languages utilize rectilinear forms with contours and rounded edges.

=== Resignation of Jony Ive ===
In 2019, Jony Ive left Apple, and started his new design office LoveFrom with longtime collaborator Marc Newson. Following Ive's departure, several personnel and leadership changes occurred within the design group. Evans Hankey took over as head of hardware design in June 2019 and later held the role of vice president of industrial design, but on October 21, 2022, Apple announced that she would depart the company. The design team began reporting directly into Chief Operating Officer Jeff Williams; in 2024, Molly Anderson was named as the industrial design leader, with most of the industrial design team reporting into her.

== Apple designers ==
Designer	Dates
Bill Dresselhaus	1979–1983
Terry Oyama	1980–1983
Rob Gemmell	1981–1989
Gavin Ivester	1987–1992 (1981–1992)
Hartmut Esslinger	1982–1989
Richard Jordan	1978–1990
Jim Stewart	1980–1984, 1987–1994
Ray Riley	1988–1995
Robert Brunner	1989–1997
Susanne Pierce Maddux	1990–1996
Kazuo Kawasaki	1990–1991
Marc van de Loo	1992-1998
Masamichi Udagawa	1992–1995
Daniele De Iuliis	1989–2019
Jony Ive	1992–2019
Christopher Stringer	1997–2017
Imran Chaudhri	1995–2017
Eugene Whang	1999–2021
Shin Nishibori	2002–2012
Rico Zorkendorfer	2004–2019
Miklu Silvanto	2011–2019
Julian Honig	2010–2019
Marc Newson	2014–2019
Evans Hankey	–2023
Sudip Shrestha	–2023
Shota Aoyagi	?–2023
Molly Anderson	2014–present
Richard Howarth	1996–present
Nic Henderson	2017–present
Abidur Chowdhury	2019-2025

== Timeline of Apple products ==
List of Apple products
See also: Timeline of the Apple II series and List of Mac models

Products on this timeline indicate introduction dates only and not necessarily discontinued dates, as new products begin on a contiguous product line.

== See also ==
- Design language
- Human interface guidelines
- AppleTalk Connector Family
- Susan Kare
- Apple Inc. design motifs
