= Sutter Hill Ventures =

American private equity firm

- Type: Private
- Industry: Venture capital
- Founded: 1964; 62 years ago
- Founder: Paul M. Wythes; Bill Draper
- Headquarters: Palo Alto, California, U.S.
- Products: Investments
- Website: www.shv.com

Sutter Hill Ventures is an American private equity firm focused on venture capital investments in technology-based start-up companies. Founded in 1964, Sutter Hill is one of the oldest venture capital firms still in operation. Based in Palo Alto, CA, the firm is primarily focused on investments in the fields of networking and computer technology, business and financial services, healthcare, web development, and pop culture, and have been known to invest in angel funds.

== History ==
Sutter Hill Ventures was founded in 1964 by Bill Draper and Paul Wythes. It began as an off-shoot of a real estate firm and was licensed as a Small Business Investment Company. The firm was an early investor in companies including Qume, a maker of disk drives and printers acquired in 1978 by ITT, and Diablo Systems, a pioneer of daisy-wheel printers that was acquired by Xerox in 1972. In the 1980s, the firm provided seed money for LSI Logic and Banyan Systems.

In May 2025, it was reported the company invested in artificial intelligence hardware start-up called io, founded in 2024 by Jony Ive, and then acquired by OpenAI for $6.5 billion, subject to regulatory approval.

== Notable Investments ==
The firm has held positions in a number of publicly traded companies, including Restoration Robotics (HAIR), Pure Storage (PSTG), Mattersight (MATR), Forty Seven (FTSV), Threshold Pharmaceuticals (THLD), Molecular Templates (MTEM), Cardica (CRDC), and Corcept Therapeutics (CORT). The firm has also incubated and invested in Snowflake Computing (SNOW) which had the record-setting technology IPO in 2020.
