= List of awards and honours received by Jane Goodall =

List of awards received by English primatologist and anthropologist Jane Goodall

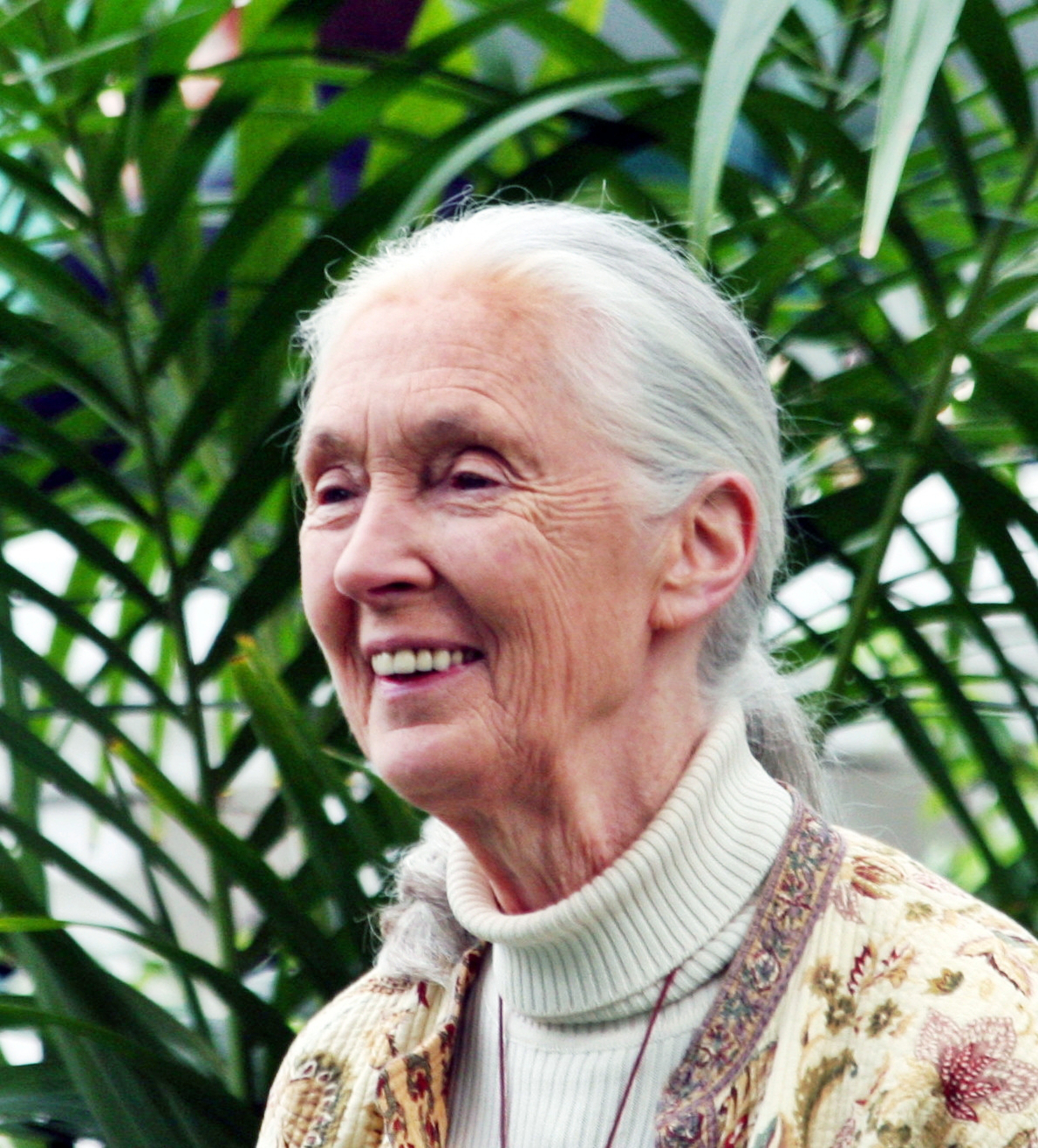
Tournament of Roses Parade Grand Marshal Jane Goodall, 11th female Grand Marshal, at Tournament House, 2012

Jane Goodall (1934 – 2025) was an English primatologist and anthropologist who was considered to be the world's foremost expert on chimpanzees.

== Awards ==
- 1974: Bradford Washburn Award, Museum of Science
- 1980: Order of the Golden Ark, World Wildlife Award for Conservations
- 1984: J. Paul Getty Wildlife Conservation Prize
- 1985: Living Legacy Award from the International Women's League
- 1985: Society of the United States; Award for Humane Excellence, American Society for the Prevention of Cruelty to Animals
- 1987: Ian Biggs' Prize
- 1987: Golden Plate Award, American Academy of Achievement
- 1989: Encyclopædia Britannica Award for Excellence on the Dissemination of Learning for the Benefit of Mankind; Anthropologist of the Year Award
- 1990: The AMES Award, American Anthropological Association; Whooping Crane Conservation Award, Conoco, Inc.; Gold Medal of the Society of Woman Geographers; Inamori Foundation Award; Washoe Award; The Kyoto Prize in Basic Science
- 1991: The Edinburgh Medal
- 1993: Rainforest Alliance Champion Award
- 1994: Chester Zoo Diamond Jubilee Medal
- 1995: Commander of the Order of the British Empire, presented by Her Majesty Queen Elizabeth II; The National Geographic Society Hubbard Medal for Distinction in Exploration, Discovery, and Research; Lifetime Achievement Award, In Defense of Animals; The Moody Gardens Environmental Award; Honorary Wardenship of Uganda National Parks
- 1996: The Zoological Society of London Silver Medal; The Tanzanian Kilimanjaro Medal; The Primate Society of Great Britain Conservation Award; The Caring Institute Award; The Polar Bear Award; William Procter Prize for Scientific Achievement
- 1997: John & Alice Tyler Prize for Environmental Achievement; David S. Ingells, Jr. Award for Excellence; Common Wealth Award for Public Service; The Field Museum's Award of Merit; Tyler Prize for Environmental Achievement; Royal Geographical Society / Discovery Channel Europe Award for A Lifetime of Discovery
- 1998: Disney's Animal Kingdom Eco Hero Award; National Science Board Public Service Award; The Orion Society's John Hay Award
- 1999: International Peace Award; Botanical Research Institute of Texas International Award of Excellence in Conservation, Community of Christ International Peace Award
- 2001: Graham J. Norton Award for Achievement in Increasing Community Livability; Rungius Award of the National Museum of Wildlife Art, USA; Roger Tory Peterson Memorial Medal, Harvard Museum of Natural History; Master Peace Award; Gandhi/King Award for Non-Violence
- 2002: The Huxley Memorial Medal, Royal Anthropological Institute of Great Britain and Ireland; United Nations "Messenger of Peace" Appointment
- 2003: Benjamin Franklin Medal in Life Science; Harvard Medical School's Center for Health and the Global Environment Award; Prince of Asturias Award for Technical and Scientific Achievement; Dame Commander of the Order of the British Empire, presented by His Royal Highness Prince Charles; Chicago Academy of Sciences' Honorary Environmental Leader Award
- 2004: Nierenberg Prize for Science in the Public Interest; Will Rogers Spirit Award, the Rotary Club of Will Rogers and Will Rogers Memorial Museums; Life Time Achievement Award, the International Fund for Animal Welfare; Honorary Degree from Haverford College
- 2005: Honorary doctorate degree in science from Syracuse University
- 2005: Honorary doctorate degree in science from Rutgers University
- 2005: Discovery and Imagination Award
- 2006: 60th Anniversary Medal of the UNESCO
- 2006: French Légion d'honneur
- 2006: Honorary doctorate degree from Open University of Tanzania
- 2007: Honorary doctorate degree in commemoration of Carl Linnaeus from Uppsala University
- 2007: Honorary doctorate degree from University of Liverpool
- 2008: Honorary doctorate degree from University of Toronto
- 2009: Honorary doctorate degree from National University of Córdoba
- 2009: Honorary doctorate degree from Pablo de Olavide University
- 2010: Bambi Award in the Category "Our Earth"
- 2010: Golden Doves for Peace journalistic prize issued by the Italian Research Institute Archivio Disarmo
- 2011: Honorary doctorate degree from American University of Paris
- 2011: Grand Officer of the Order of Merit of the Italian Republic
- 2012: Named grand marshal of the 2013 Tournament of Roses Parade
- 2012: Honorary doctorate degree from National Tsing Hua University (NTHU, Taiwan)
- 2013: Key to the city by Gustavo Petro, former mayor of Bogota (Colombia)
- 2013: Awarded an honorary doctorate by Trinity College Dublin
- 2014: President's Medal by the British Academy
- 2015: The Perfect World Foundation Award The Conservationist of the years 2015 & The Prize "The Fragile Rhino"
- 2017: International Cosmos Prize
- 2017: Honorary Doctor of Laws from the University of Winnipeg
- 2018: Honorary doctorate degree in science from Simon Fraser University
- 2019: Gold Medal of the Royal Canadian Geographical Society
- 2019: Honorary doctorate degree in science from McGill University
- 2020: Honorary doctorate degree in science from Hasselt University
- 2020: Tang Prize in Sustainable Development
- In 2020 Goodall was the Professor Hawking Fellow of the Cambridge Union in the University of Cambridge.
- In 2021 the Sanctuary Nature Foundation, honoured Dr. Jane Goodall with the Sanctuary Wildlife Legend Award (https://www.sanctuarynaturefoundation.org/award/dr.-jane-goodall%2C-dbe).
- 2021: Templeton Prize
- 2022: Stephen Hawking Medal for Science Communication
- 2023: Officer of the Order of Orange-Nassau
- 2025: Presidential Medal of Freedom
