= Thomas Mahon =

Thomas Mahon may refer to:

- Thomas Mahon (Irish MP) (1701–1782), MP for County Roscommon
- Thomas Mahon, 2nd Baron Hartland (1766–1835), MP for County Roscommon, grandson of the above
- Thomas Mahon (tailor), English tailor and weblogger
- Thomas J. Mahon, American politician and jurist
