= Jerry Manock =

American industrial designer (born 1944)

Jerrold Clifford Manock (born February 21, 1944) is an American industrial designer. He worked for Apple Computer from 1977 to 1984, contributing to housing designs for the Apple II, Apple III, and early compact Macintosh computers. Manock is widely regarded as the "father" of the Apple Industrial Design Group. Since 1976, he is the president and principal designer of Manock Comprehensive Design, Inc., with offices in Palo Alto, California, and Burlington, Vermont.

== Education and career ==
Manock attended Stanford University, where he earned his B.S. in mechanical engineering in 1966 and his M.S. in Mechanical Engineering–Product Design in 1968. For his master's project, he worked on a device to aid in percussion-drainage therapy for children with cystic fibrosis.

From 1968 to 1972, Manock worked as a product design engineer in the Microwave Division of Hewlett-Packard, Palo Alto, California. From 1972 to 1975 he was chief mechanical engineer at Telesensory Systems, Inc., of Palo Alto. He then worked as a freelance product design consultant; in 1977 he took on Apple Computer as a client and consulted on the product design and mechanical engineering of the Apple II personal computer.

=== Apple Design Team ===
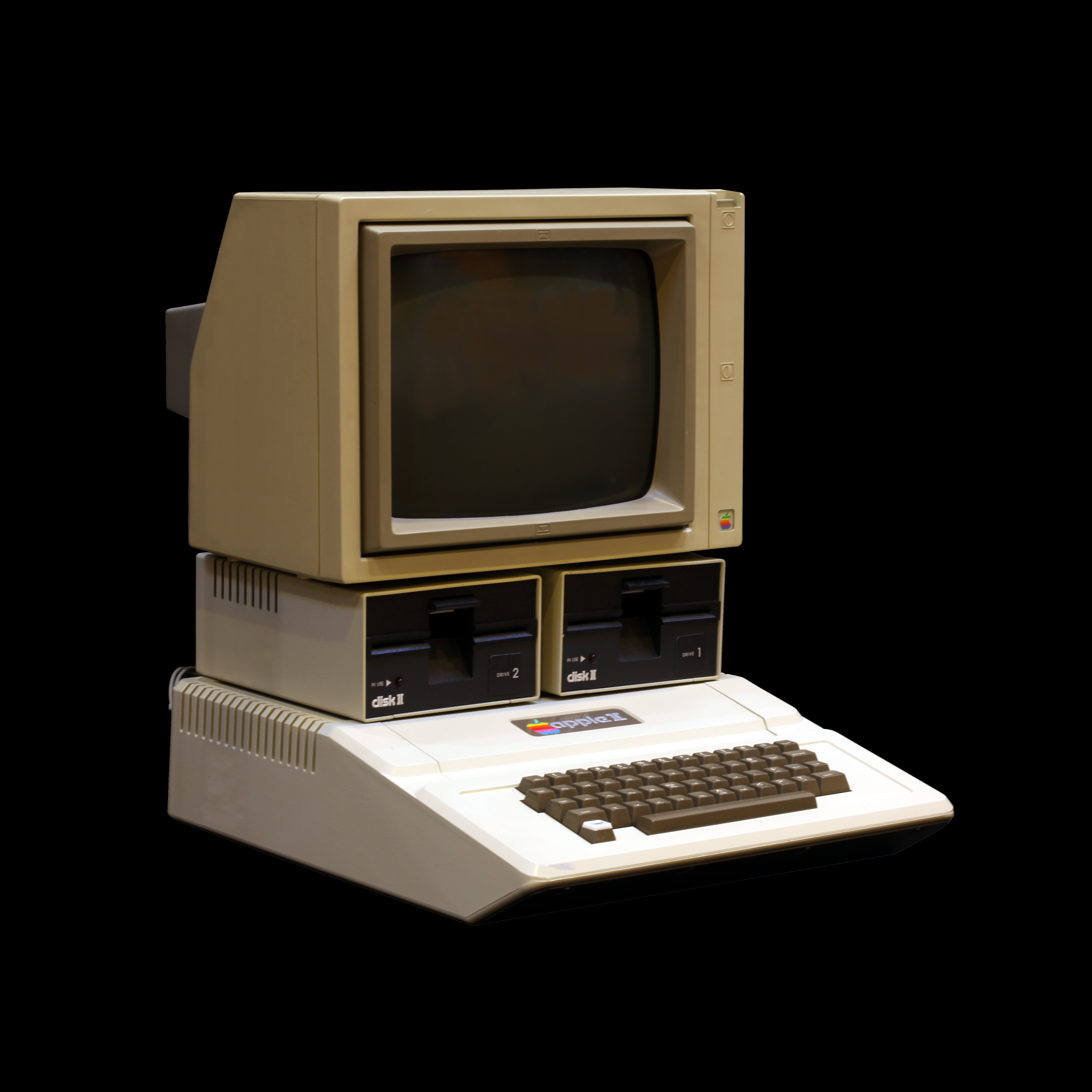
Apple II computer (1977)

Manock joined Apple in 1979 as corporate manager of product design. Working under the direction of Steve Jobs, Manock led the product designs of the Apple II, the Apple III, and the "Cuisinart-inspired" upright casing for the first Macintosh computer, which necessitated a detached keyboard. Manock also worked on the Disk II, Disk III, and Lisa office computer.

Manock was a member of the original Macintosh design team. In January 1981, when Jobs usurped management of the Macintosh project, he brought in Manock and Terry Oyama to design the computer housing. According to Jason O'Grady in Apple Inc., Manock was "hand-picked" by Jef Raskin to work on the Macintosh design team. In a 1984 interview, Manock said that the initial design goal was for a computer housing with "portability", but that idea was replaced by the design goal of "minimal desk space". As a result, the design team created a keyboard smaller than the width of the computer. Manock contributed the idea of using icons on the outside of the machine rather than English words to make the Macintosh more international. This style is mirrored in the ROM, which uses icons instead of English-language directions, such as a frowning face when the computer needs to reboot and a smiling face indicating booting.

His work from this period is included in Pirouette: Turning Points in Design, an exhibition at the Museum of Modern Art featuring "widely recognized design icons [...] highlighting pivotal moments in design history."

=== Patents ===
Manock is the co-inventor of:

- Personal computer (U.S. Patent No. D268584), April 12, 1983
- Dual disk drive (U.S. Patent No. D271102), October 25, 1983
- Housing for moveable cursor control for a video display (U.S. Patent No. D284284), June 17, 1986
- Computer housing (U.S. Patent No. D285687), September 16, 1986
- Keypad (U.S. Patent No. D286047), October 7, 1986
- Disk drive housing (U.S. Patent No. D286050), October 7, 1986
- Disk drive case (U.S. Patent No. D290257), June 9, 1987
- Equatorial sundial apparatus utilizing one or more concave cylindrical focusing mirrors (U.S. Patent No. 6301793), October 16, 2001

== Teaching ==
Manock is a part-time lecturer on product design at the University of Vermont.

== Family ==
Manock married Mary Ellen Tobey and they have two daughters, Abigail and Katherine.

== Bibliography ==
- Shirland, L.E.; Manock, J.C. (August 2000). "Collaborative teaching of integrated product development: a case study". IEEE Transactions on Education. 43 (3). Institute of Electrical and Electronics Engineers Education Society: 343–348. Bibcode:2000ITEdu..43..343S. doi:10.1109/13.865212.
- IPD team
