= Leslie Berlin =

American historian

- Occupation: historian
- Writing career
- Genre: non-fiction
- Website: leslieberlinauthor.com

Leslie Berlin is an American historian. Berlin is Project Historian for the Silicon Valley Archives at Stanford University.

== Career ==
Berlin received her Ph.D. in History from Stanford University in 2001 and also holds a B.A. from Yale University in American Studies.

Berlin's first book, 2005's The Man Behind the Microchip: Robert Noyce and the Invention of Silicon Valley, was a biography of inventor-entrepreneur Robert Noyce.

Her second book, 2017's Troublemakers: Silicon Valley's Coming of Age, is a history of the Valley in the period 1969-1983. Troublemakers looks at the work of seven individuals during these years when the software, personal computing, video game, advanced semiconductor logic, and venture capital industries first took shape. Bob Taylor kick-started the precursor to the Internet, the Arpanet, and masterminded the personal computer. Mike Markkula served as Apple’s first chairman, with an ownership stake equal to that of Steve Wozniak and Steve Jobs. Sandra Kurtzig, an early software entrepreneur, was the first woman to take a technology company public. Bob Swanson cofounded Genentech. Al Alcorn designed the first wildly successful video game, Atari’s Pong. Fawn Alvarez rose from an assembler on a factory line to the executive suite. Niels Reimers changed how university innovations reach the public; in the process, he helped launch the biotech industry.

Berlin was a Fellow at the Center for Advanced Study in the Behavioral Sciences from 2012–2013 and served on the advisory committee to the Lemelson Center for the Study of Invention and Innovation at the Smithsonian’s National Museum of American History. She was a “Prototype” columnist for The New York Times and has commented on Silicon Valley for the Wall Street Journal, NPR, PBS, the BBC, The Atlantic and Wired.

== Works ==
- The Man Behind the Microchip: Robert Noyce and the Invention of Silicon Valley New York; Oxford: Oxford University Press, 2005. ISBN 9780195311990, OCLC 847349915
- Troublemakers: Silicon Valley's Coming of Age, Simon & Schuster Ltd, 2017. ISBN 9781451651508, OCLC 1008957514
