= Kazuo Kawasaki =

Japanese industrial designer

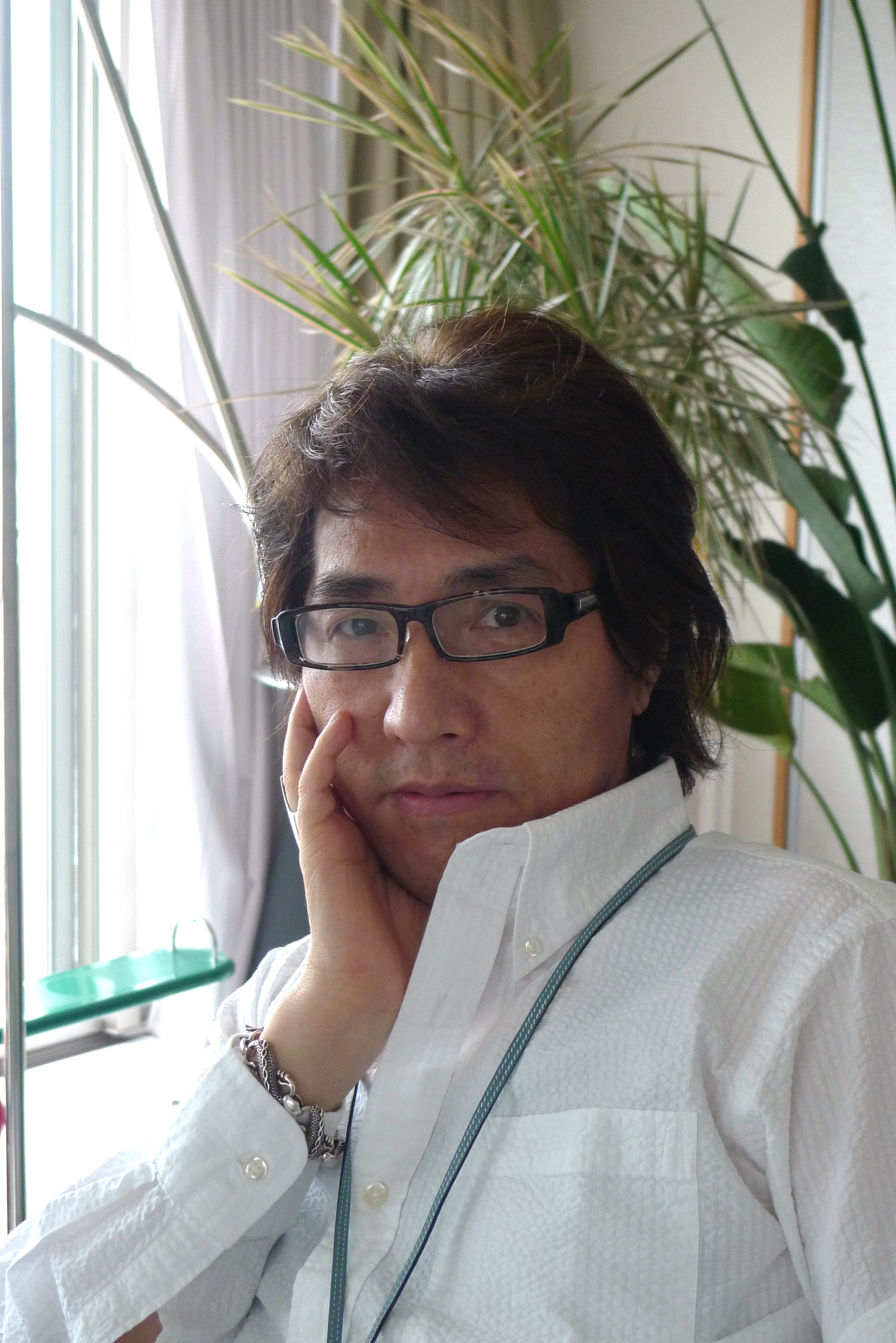
Kazuo Kawasaki

Kazuo Kawasaki (川崎和男) is a Japanese industrial designer born in Fukui Prefecture in 1949. He graduated from Kanazawa College of Art in 1972. Kawasaki is a professor at Osaka University and a visiting professor at Tama Art University and Kanazawa Institute of Technology. Representative works include the wheelchair "CARNA" (part of the permanent collection at MoMA New York), the "Kazuo Kawasaki" brand of eyeware and the "EIZO" brand of computer displays.

One of his research projects is artificial heart design.

Kawasaki was Apple design director in the early 1990s and designed portable computer devices (named MindTop, POPEYE, Pluto, Sweatpea, JEEP).
