= LoveFrom =

American design collective

LoveFrom, Inc
- Type: Private
- Industry: Industrial design, interaction design
- Founded: 2019
- Founder: Jony Ive
- Headquarters: San Francisco, California, United States
- Key people: Marc Newson
- Number of employees: 60 (May 2025)
- Website: lovefrom.com

LoveFrom, Inc is an American collective of designers and creatives founded in 2019 by Jony Ive. The company is based in San Francisco, California, and has a team of 60. Clients include Apple Inc., Airbnb, Ferrari and Moncler.

== History ==
LoveFrom was founded by Jony Ive after his departure from Apple Inc in 2019, where he led the company’s design operation for 23 years. The designer Marc Newson was a founding member. Apple was LoveFrom’s first client and continued to work with the company until July 2022.

In October 2020, the company began working with Airbnb on the redesign of its core products and services. In the announcement, Airbnb chief executive Brian Chesky said: “We have made the decision to work together through a multi-year relationship to design the next generation of Airbnb products and services.”

LoveFrom signed a multi-year partnership with Exor and Ferrari in September 2021 to "explore a range of creative projects with Exor in the business of luxury." As part of the partnership, LoveFrom designed Ferrari’s first electric car, the Luce.

In November 2021, it was announced that the company was working with King Charles III to design the Terra Carta Seal as part of the King’s Sustainable Markets Initiative. In June 2023, the initiative introduced its Astra Carta project, for which LoveFrom also designed a new seal and custom typography.

In November 2021, the company announced a new partnership with Italian luxury fashion brand Moncler. The LoveFrom Moncler collection launched in September 2024, featuring modular garments with magnetic buttons.

LoveFrom worked with the Steve Jobs Archive to release Make Something Wonderful, a collection of letters and writing by the Apple co-founder that was published as a book, ebook and custom website in April 2023.

Announced in July 2023, LoveFrom partnered with Scottish audio firm Linn, releasing a limited-edition version of the Sondek LP12 turntable.

In September 2024, The New York Times reported that LoveFrom is working with OpenAI on the development of an artificial intelligence hardware device. Marc Newson said that “what the product would be and when it would be released were still being determined.” A report in April 2025 claimed that OpenAI had discussed buying the hardware start-up and its team of engineers. Laurene Powell Jobs' Emerson Collective was reported to be an investor.

In May 2025, LoveFrom announced its work with William Stout Architectural Books, a neighboring book shop in Jackson Square, San Francisco. As part of the partnership, LoveFrom redesigned the company’s logo and created a custom typeface, along with a series of illustrations of the company’s storefront and founder. These designs were subsequently used across the company’s products and website. The work was completed on a pro bono basis.

In May 2025, it was announced OpenAI would acquire the venture, called io, in a deal that values the company at $6.5 billion. As part of the deal, OpenAI will become a customer of LoveFrom with the company assuming creative and design responsibilities across all of OpenAI’s operations. LoveFrom will remain an independent company with other customers. On July 9, 2025, OpenAI and io announced the completion of the merger.

In September 2025, Balmuda announced it had worked with LoveFrom to design a variant of its product The Lantern dubbed Sailing Lantern. The design originated from Ive's "quest for a lantern for his sailboat".

In 2026, five years after their partnership announcement, Ferrari began to reveal the Ferrari Luce, its first electric car which was designed by LoveFrom. At an event in San Francisco in February, the two companies revealed the interior and interface of the Luce. The interior design combines physical components of switches, buttons and rotary dials with a digital, touchscreen display. Ferrari said LoveFrom had been given "the creative space to define the project’s design direction from the outset".

In March 2026, Christie’s announced that LoveFrom had designed a new auctioneer’s rostrum to mark the company's 260-year anniversary. The rostrum, made from oak with stainless steel elements, was inspired by the original Christie’s rostrum designed by Thomas Chippendale in the 18th century. It will be used across all of Christie's auction houses globally.

On May 25, 2026, Ferrari unveiled the full Ferrari Luce in Rome, revealing its exterior. Designed by LoveFrom, the Luce is a four-door, five-seater model with a low, cab-forward profile, center-opening doors and a large glass canopy and windscreen. The company said the car's exterior was designed to maximize aerodynamic efficiency and its range. The design marked a departure in design from Ferrari's traditional, petrol-powered cars. Marc Newson, from LoveFrom, told Motor Trend, "It doesn't have all the typical design cues; we came to the conclusion that was actually the point of the exercise. There aren't any five seat Ferraris around, so this is by definition unique."

== Operations ==
LoveFrom is based in the Jackson Square neighborhood of San Francisco. The company has capabilities across industrial design, graphic design, user interface, architecture, CAD sculpting, writing, filmmaking and music.

Ive has reportedly spent $90 million on four buildings in Jackson Square. Two of these buildings on Montgomery Street are being renovated and will become LoveFrom’s studio, including a store scheduled to open in 2025.

=== Identity ===
LoveFrom is known for its highly minimalist brand and identity, in keeping with Ive’s design philosophy. In October 2021, the company unveiled its logotype that included a comma at the end, which Ive described as a defining part of the brand. Peter Saville, who designed the comma, said the additional feature “gave the name some sincerity.” LoveFrom published the logotype on a new website formed of a single page with no images or links. The website stated: “LoveFrom is a creative collective. We are designers, architects, musicians, filmmakers, writers, engineers and artists. You may know us by our past work. We are obsessed with the traditions of creating and making. Fanatically devoted to excellence. Insatiably curious. We collaborate with leaders and founders. We work on projects for joy. We develop our own ideas. love & fury.”

In September 2024, the company updated its website to introduce an animated version of its mascot, a bear called Montgomery. The bear is named after San Francisco’s Montgomery Street where the company is based.

== Scholarships and charitable work ==
In April 2023, LoveFrom announced an international design scholarship program with the Royal College of Art, Rhode Island School of Design and California College of the Arts. The scholarships aim to encourage and support students from under-represented communities into the design industry. The scholarships are funded through $1.5 million endowments at each college, which use annual interest to cover scholars’ tuition and some living costs for the duration of the course. The scholarships will run in perpetuity. LoveFrom said in a statement: “We recognize that lack of diversity has negatively impacted both the design community and society. The LoveFrom Scholarship program aims to increase representation by encouraging and supporting routes into industry for designers of all backgrounds.”

LoveFrom redesigned the red nose for Comic Relief's Red Nose Day in March 2023, sold to raise money for charity each year. The new design was recyclable and folded flat for easier distribution.
