= Jony Ive =

English designer (born 1967)

Sir Jony Ive KBE HonFREng RDI
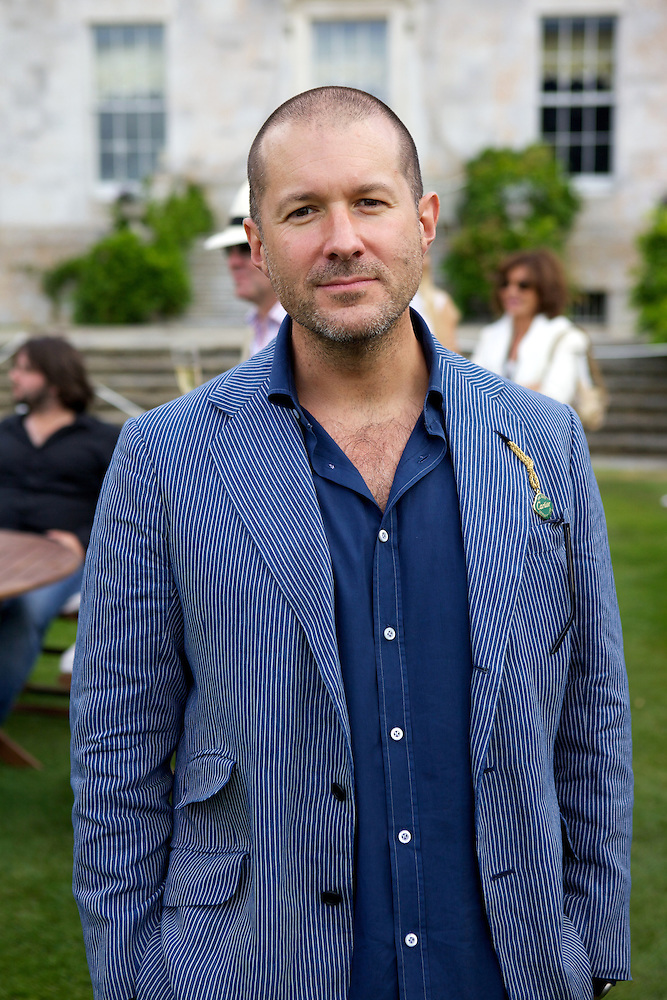
- Ive at Goodwood Festival of Speed in 2010
- Born: Jonathan Paul Ive; 27 February 1967 (age 59); Chingford, London, England
- Citizenship: United Kingdom; United States (since 2012)
- Education: Newcastle Polytechnic (BA)
- Occupation: Industrial designer
- Known for: Former chief design officer at Apple Inc.; Co-designer of the iMac, iPod, iPhone, iPad, Apple Watch, AirPods and iOS
- Spouse: Heather Pegg (m. 1987)
- Children: 2
- Awards: Full list

Chancellor of the Royal College of Art
- Incumbent
- Assumed office 1 July 2017
- Preceded by: James Dyson (as Provost)

Sir Jonathan Paul Ive (born 27 February 1967) is a British-American designer. He is best known for his work at Apple Inc., where he was senior vice-president of industrial design and chief design officer. Ive is the founder of LoveFrom, a creative collective that works with Ferrari, Airbnb, OpenAI and other global brands. He has been chancellor of the Royal College of Art in London since 2017 and a trustee of the British Museum since June 2025.

Ive joined Apple in September 1992, and was promoted to senior vice-president of industrial design in the late 1990s after the return of co-founder Steve Jobs. He was chief design officer from 2015 until his departure in July 2019. Working closely with Jobs, Ive played a vital role in the designs of products including the Apple Watch, iMac, Power Mac G4 Cube, iPod, iPhone, iPad, MacBook, and the user interface of Apple's mobile operating system iOS. He was involved with the design process of major architectural projects, including Apple's Cupertino headquarters complex, Apple Park, and Apple Stores.

Born in London, Ive lived there until his family moved to Stafford when he was about 12. He studied design at Newcastle Polytechnic (Note: Now called Northumbria University, after 1992) and later joined the London-based design firm Tangerine, where he worked on client projects for LG and Ideal Standard as well as Apple. After leaving Tangerine to join Apple full time, he began designing the decade's PowerBooks and Macs. He acquired US citizenship in 2012. He was invited to join the Royal College of Art in May 2017 as its head of college, serving a fixed five-year term until May 2022.

Ive has received accolades and honours for his designs and patents. In the United Kingdom, he has been appointed a Royal Designer for Industry (RDI), an Honorary Fellow of the Royal Academy of Engineering (HonFREng), and a Knight Commander of the Order of the British Empire (KBE). In 2018, he was awarded the Hawking Fellowship of the Cambridge Union Society. In a 2004 BBC poll of cultural writers, Ive was ranked the most influential person in British culture. His designs have been described as integral to the successes of Apple, one of the world's largest information technology companies by revenue and market capitalisation.

== Early life and education ==
Jonathan Paul Ive was born on 27 February 1967 in Chingford, London, United Kingdom. His father, Michael Ive, was a silversmith who lectured at Middlesex Polytechnic, and his grandfather was an engineer. While attending secondary school, he was diagnosed with dyslexia.

Ive was inspired to become a designer by his teenage love of cars. He investigated car design courses in London, including one at the Royal College of Art, but was repelled by the students: "The classes were full of students making vroom! vroom! noises as they drew." He studied industrial design at Newcastle Polytechnic, where he was introduced to forms of design inspired by the Bauhaus. The Bauhaus expressed the idea of only including what is needed into designs. This philosophy can be seen in his work with Apple. While at Newcastle, some of his designs – including a telephone and a hearing aid – were exhibited at the Design Museum in London. He graduated with a first class Bachelor of Arts in 1989.

== Career ==
Ive's designs at Polytechnic won the RSA Student Design Award in 1988 and 1989, which gave him a small stipend and travel expense account to use for a trip to the United States. He travelled to San Francisco, where he met designers including Robert Brunner, who ran a small consultancy firm that would later join Apple Computer. After returning to England six weeks later, Ive interned at the product design agency Roberts Weaver Group (his college sponsor), where he impressed executives with his attention to detail and work ethic.

=== Tangerine ===
After a year with Roberts Weaver, Ive joined a London-based design agency, Tangerine, in Hoxton Square. He designed a diverse array of products, such as microwave ovens, toilets, drills and toothbrushes for clients including LG and Ideal Standard. However, he became frustrated after he designed a toilet, bidet and sink for Ideal Standard, and the company rejected the work, stating that the products were too costly and looked too modern. He became unhappy with his clients who had different ideas.

From 1990 to 1992, Brunner tried to recruit Ive to Apple. During this time, Apple became a client of Tangerine. Ive worked on "Project Juggernaut" for Apple, investigating the future of portable computers and setting the stage for what would become the PowerBook.

=== Apple ===
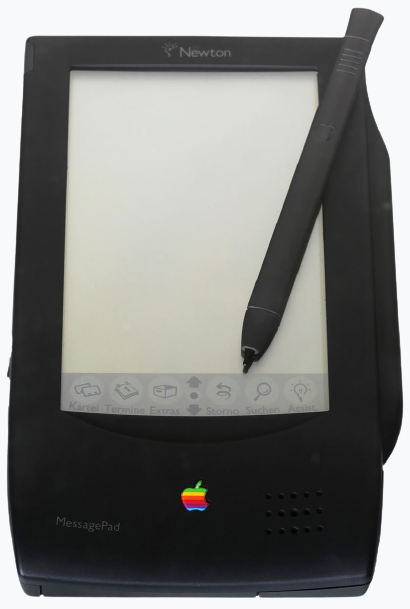
Apple Newton MessagePad, released in 1993. Ive designed the smaller models following.

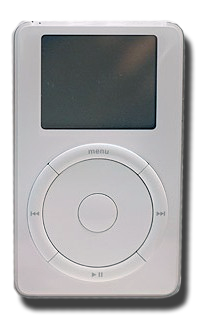
First iPod, introduced in 2001. Jon Rubinstein assembled the original design team including Ive as lead design engineer.

A vector rendition of the first-generation iPhone, first marketed in 2007. Its form factor is credited to Ive.

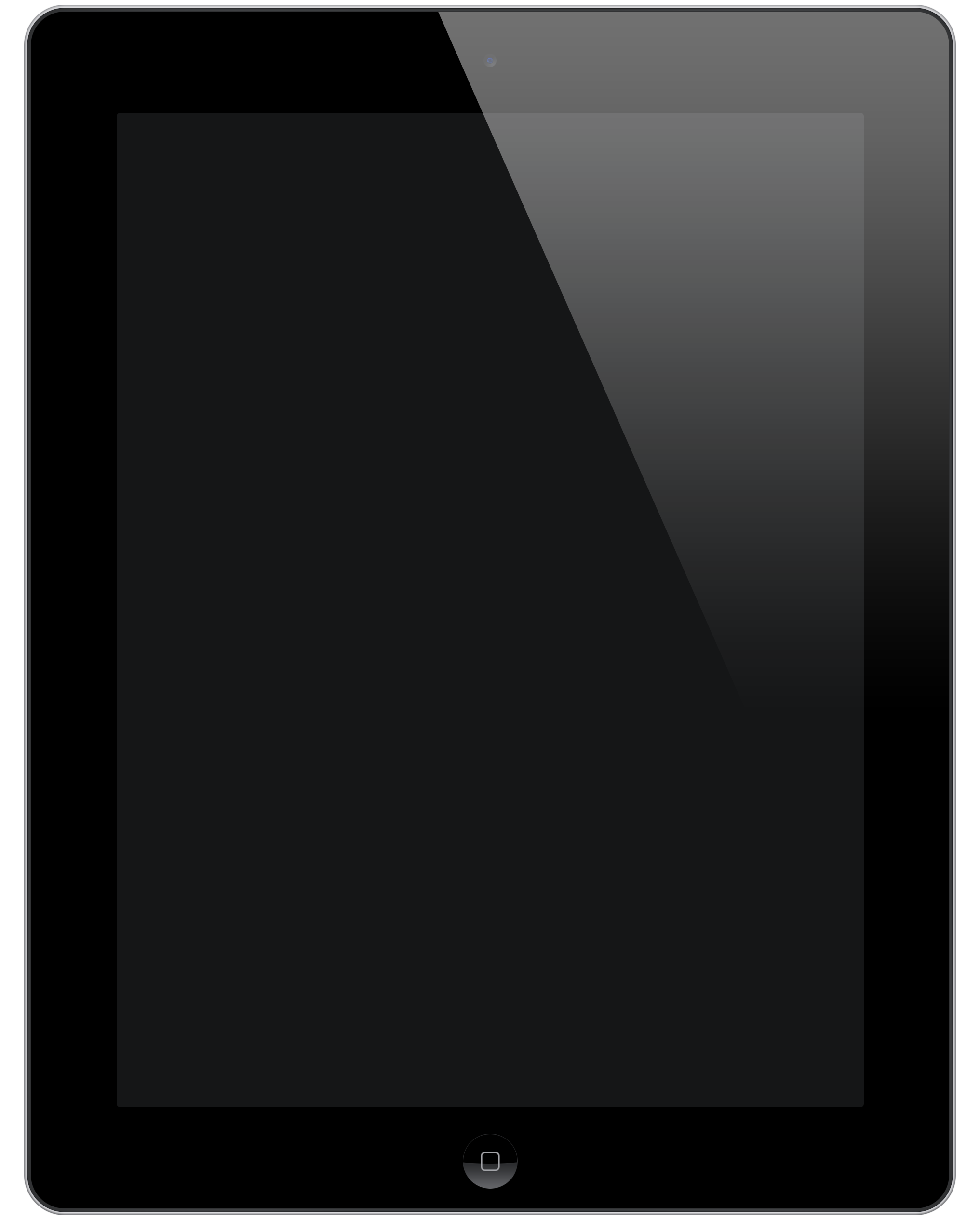
Although Ive's studio began designing an iPad-like device before the iPhone, the iPad was first released in 2010.

He was formally recruited to Apple as a full-time employee in September 1992. Ive was initially apprehensive about joining Apple given the move from the UK to the US. His first major assignment in Apple's Industrial Design Group regarded the second generation of the Newton and the MessagePad 110. A lack of emphasis on design during the early 1990s prompted Ive to consider quitting.

Steve Jobs, who left in 1985 after being pushed away by John Sculley, was staging a return to the company and recruited Ive to join him in taking the firm in a different direction. Jon Rubinstein, Ive's boss at the time, managed to retain Ive as an employee by explaining that Apple was "going to make history" under Jobs in 1996.

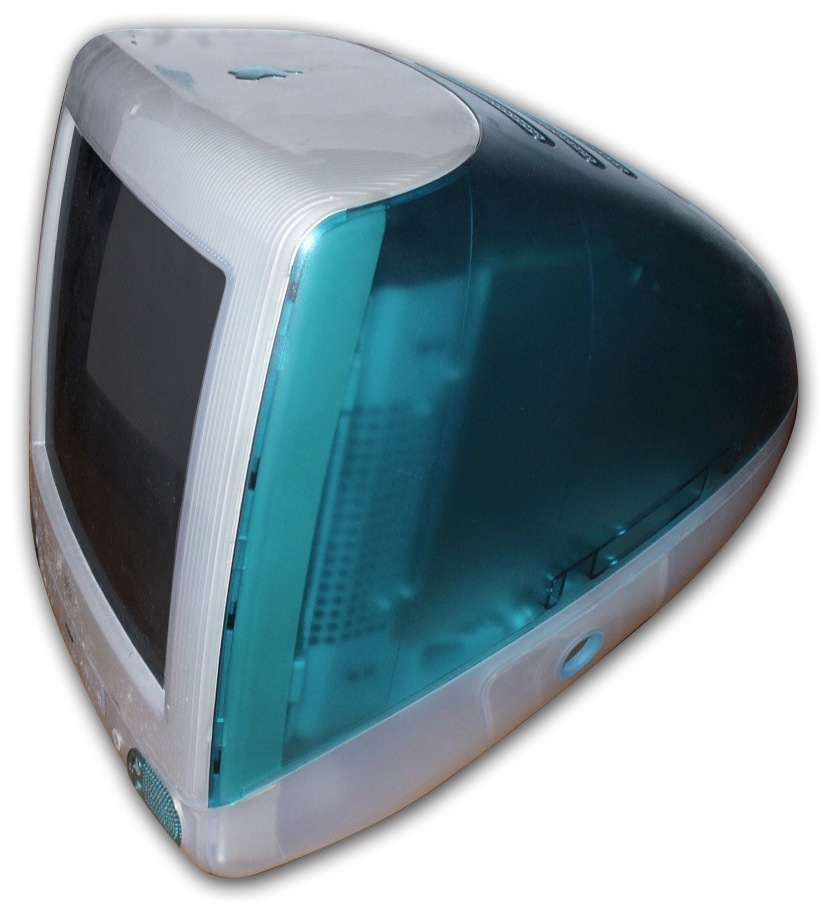
Original 1998 iMac G3, for which Ive designed the translucent case

Ive became the senior vice-president of industrial design in 1997 heading up the industrial design team responsible for most of the company's significant hardware products. Ive's first assignment in this capacity was the iMac, introduced in 1998 (he is credited with designing its translucent plastic case). The iMac helped pave the way for many other designs such as the iPod and eventually the iPhone and the iPad.

Ive was given his own design office at Apple during the early 2000s in which he oversaw the work of his appointed design team, and he was the only Apple designer with a private office. Only his core team—which consisted of around 15 people from the UK, the US, Japan, Australia, and New Zealand (who had worked together for around two decades)—and top Apple executives were allowed into the office, because it contained all of the concepts, including prototypes, that the design team was working on. Ive did not allow his children to enter the office.

In 2011, it was reported that Ive was paid $30 million in base salary with a $25 million stock bonus for the year. His compensation ceased to be publicly disclosed by the firm thereafter, rendering him the only Apple executive to be afforded such a provision. A year later, it was estimated that his net worth was £80 million.

Ive led the design and development of the Apple Watch beginning in early 2012. The product was released in April 2015 and has become the best-selling wearable device in the world with 115 million people estimated wearing one as of December 2022. Talking about the product, Ive said in 2018: "we were all routinely carrying around incredibly powerful products, in terms of their technical ability, in our pockets … an obvious continuation of this path that we’ve been on for so many years was to make technology more personal and more accessible."

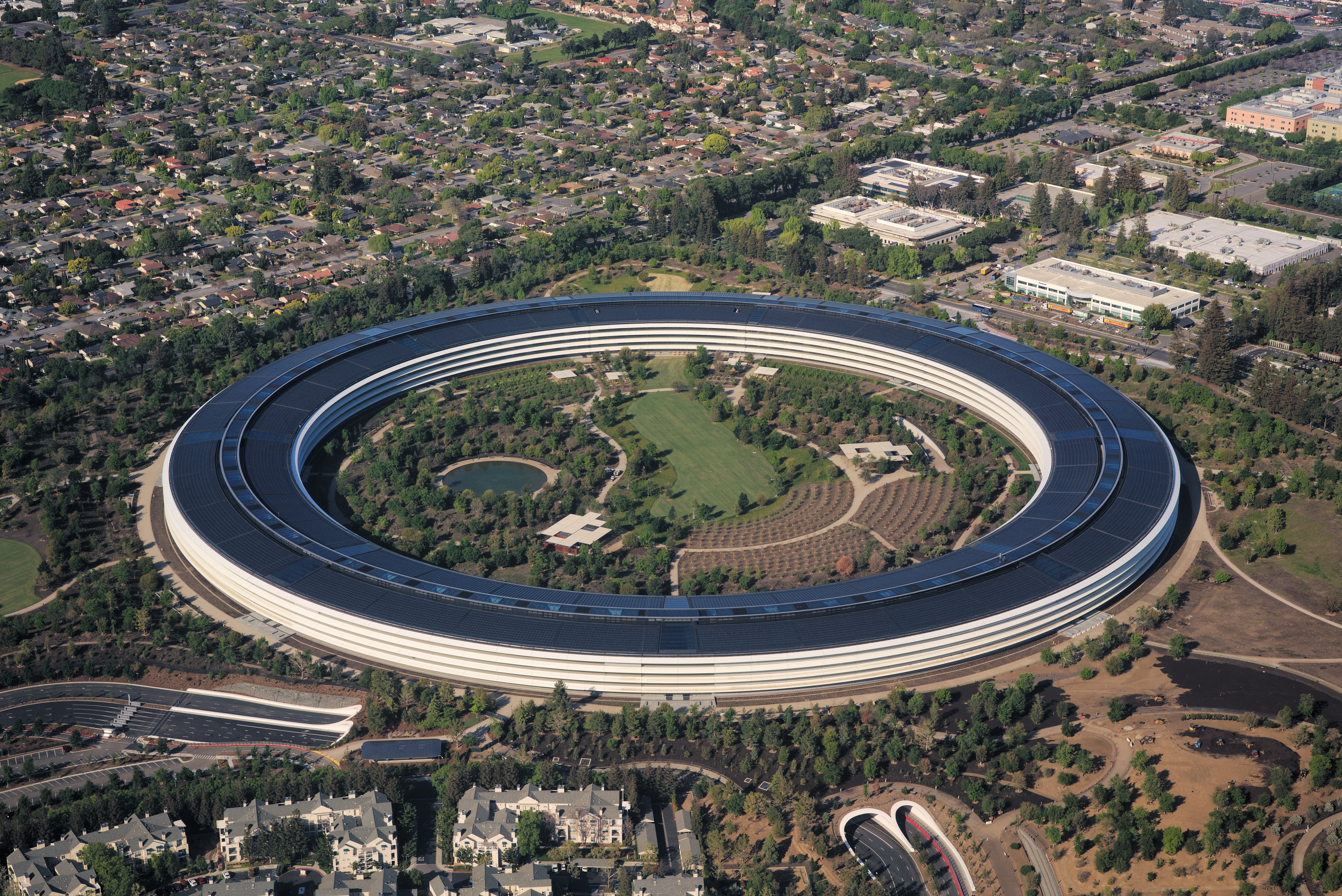
Ive played a pivotal role, with Norman Foster, in the design of Apple Park (pictured), which opened in 2017.

On 29 October 2012, Apple announced that Ive would "provide leadership and direction for Human Interface (HI) across the company, in addition to his role as the leader of Industrial Design." With the 2013 Worldwide Developers Conference (WWDC) announcement of iOS 7 and Ive's role as principal, Apple press information was also updated to reflect his new title: senior vice-president of design. In the same press update, Ive stated that he hoped his best work was yet to emerge and that he preferred to be identified as a maker of products, rather than a designer. On 26 May 2015, the firm announced that Ive was promoted to chief design officer (CDO), at the time one of only three C-level executives at Apple along with CEO Tim Cook and CFO Luca Maestri (Jeff Williams would be promoted to COO at the end of 2015). On 8 December 2017, Apple announced that Ive would resume direct responsibility for the company's product design.

On 27 June 2019, Apple announced that Ive would depart Apple after 27 years.

==== Relationship with Steve Jobs ====
Ive described his rapport with Jobs in 2014: "When we were looking at objects, what our eyes physically saw and what we came to perceive were exactly the same. And we would ask the same questions, have the same curiosity about things."

Jobs described Ive as his "spiritual partner at Apple", stating that

"The difference that Jony has made, not only at Apple but in the world, is huge. He is a wickedly intelligent person in all ways. He understands business concepts, marketing concepts. He picks stuff up just like that, click. He understands what we do at our core better than anyone. If I had a spiritual partner at Apple, it's Jony. Jony and I think up most of the products together and then pull others in and say, 'Hey, what do you think about this?' He gets the big picture as well as the most infinitesimal details about each product. And he understands that Apple is a product company. He's not just a designer. That's why he works directly for me. He has more operational power than anyone else at Apple except me. There's no one who can tell him what to do, or to butt out. That's the way I set it up."

The offices of Jobs and Ive in Apple's Cupertino headquarters were linked by a covered corridor. Ive delivered the eulogy for Jobs at both the Apple employee memorial service and the family service in 2011.

=== Royal College of Art ===
Ive received an honorary degree from the Royal College of Art (RCA) in 2009. On 25 May 2017, Ive was appointed Chancellor of the RCA in London, effective 1 July 2017, succeeding Sir James Dyson. In this position he serves a fixed five-year term as the head of college, where he will govern the college as an academic administrator. Ive began running committee meetings, attending faculty meetings, and conferring degrees in the summer of 2017. Ive said of the appointment: "I am thrilled to formalise my relationship with the RCA, given the profound influence the college has had on so many of the artists and designers that I admire." Ive was still chancellor in January 2023.

=== LoveFrom ===
In June 2019, Ive announced the launch of his own independent firm named LoveFrom, along with fellow designer Marc Newson. LoveFrom keeps a low profile but in October 2021 unveiled a minimalistic website.

Upon launch in 2019, Apple was a client of Ive's. In July 2022, the consulting agreement with Apple was ended, thus ending Ive's relationship with the company.

LoveFrom works with a number of brands including Ferrari and Airbnb. Ive is close friends with Airbnb chief executive Brian Chesky. Through Terra Carta Design Lab in 2021 and Charles's coronation in 2023, Ive has produced designs for Charles III.

In September 2021, Ive began working with Ferrari as one of his first clients after leaving Apple, when LoveFrom and Exor agreed a multi-year partnership, which included the design of the company's first electric production car.

In 2023, Ive led the development of a foldable red nose for Comic Relief. In the same year, LoveFrom announced its own scholarship programme, which is aimed at increasing representation in the design industry by supporting designers from all backgrounds. The programme covers the full tuition of a student at the California College of the Arts, the Rhode Island School of Design and two students at the Royal College of Art each year.

In September 2024, LoveFrom announced the launch of a new outerwear collection in collaboration with Moncler. In the same month, the company unveiled a new logo in the latest iteration of its brand. The new logo includes the addition of a bear, which is LoveFrom's mascot called Montgomery, named after San Francisco's Montgomery Street where the company is based.

In September 2024, the New York Times reported that LoveFrom is working with OpenAI on the development of an AI hardware device that is "less socially disruptive than the iPhone". In May 2025, it was announced OpenAI would acquire Ive's AI venture io for $6.5 billion. Ive founded io in 2024 with Scott Cannon, Evans Hankey and Tang Tan. As part of the deal, OpenAI will become a customer of LoveFrom with Ive and LoveFrom assuming creative and design responsibilities across all of OpenAI's operations. LoveFrom will remain an independent company with other customers. On 9 July 2025, OpenAI and io announced the completion of the merger.

In February 2026, Ferrari revealed the interior and interface design of the Ferrari Luce, its first electric car, designed by LoveFrom. In May 2026, Ferrari unveiled the completed Luce, more than five years since Ive began working with Ferrari. Ive's LoveFrom was the first non-Italian company to design one of Ferrari's production cars. The design was criticised by some Ferrari fans and enthusiasts, causing a dip in the company's stock after its launch, but received positive reviews from automotive publications and car reviewers, including Top Gear and Evo.

In March 2026, Christie's announced the redesign of its new rostrum at its London salesroom, designed by Ive and LoveFrom. Christie's asked Ive to redesign its rostrum to mark its 260-year anniversary. The new design, made from oak with stainless steel elements, was inspired by the original rostrum designed by Thomas Chippendale in the 1700s.

=== British Museum ===
In June 2025, Ive was appointed a trustee of the British Museum. Ive said of the appointment: "I am thrilled to be working with such a wonderful team, and look forward to supporting the Museum's appropriately ambitious Masterplan for transformation."

== Public image ==
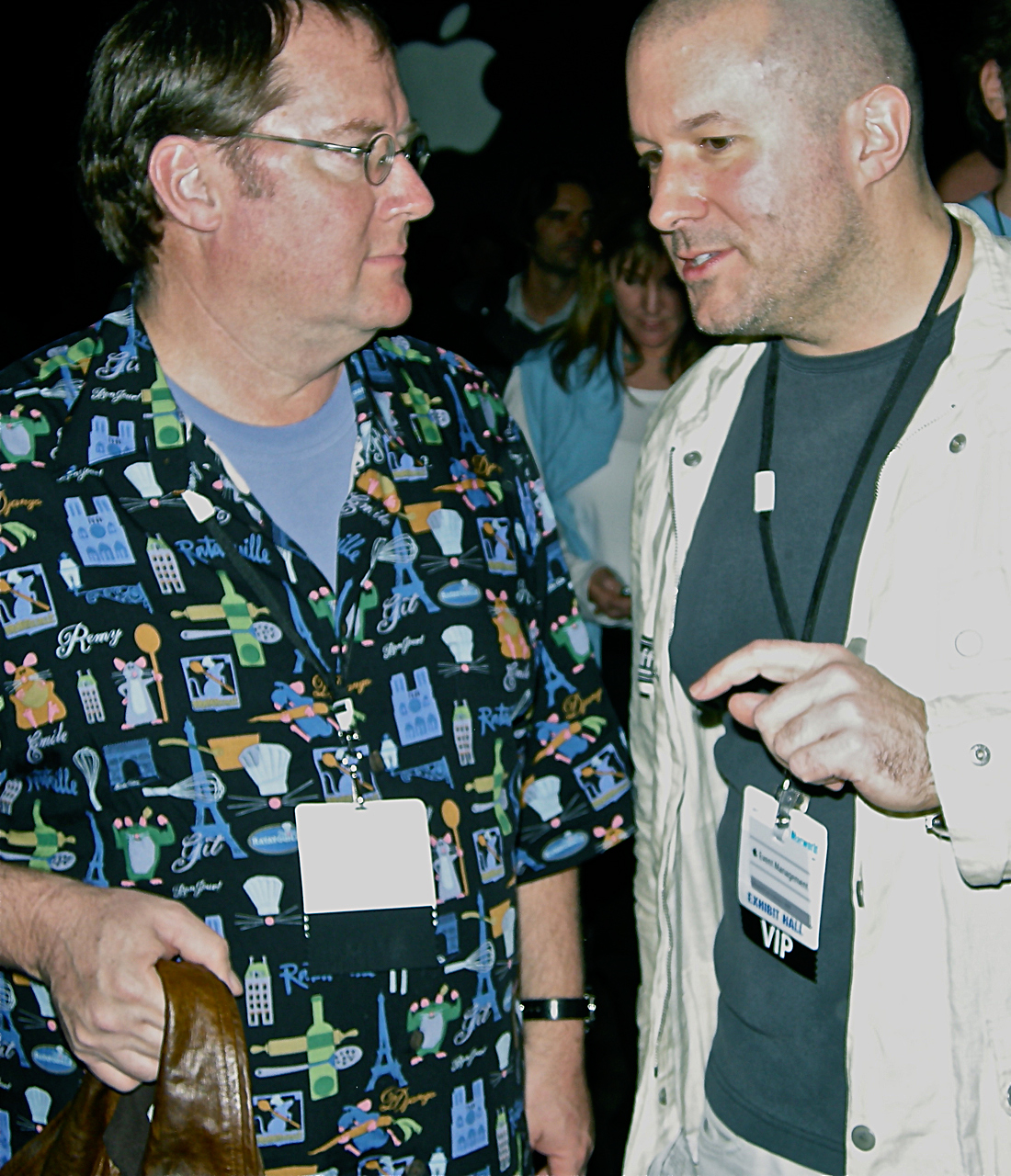
Ive with Pixar CCO John Lasseter at Macworld/iWorld in 2008

Ive is known for his minimalist, downplayed sense of style and presentation of self. Chief among his public image is his "nearly shaved head and tightly trimmed beard". It is estimated that Ive first shaved his head in a tight buzzcut and coupled it with stubble when, in 2001, aged 34, he was promoted to vice-president of industrial design at Apple. His look had him referred to as one of the "100 Most Powerful Bald Men in the World" by GQ in their 2013 listing. Known for its minimalist look, it has inspired Halloween costumes, grooming regimens, and a small-scale fashion movement, among other things.

He has been known to sport "signature looks" that include: multi-coloured pied-de-poule suits, painter's pants, canvas pants, linen button-down shirts, Clarks Wallabees, and mono-coloured t-shirts. His favourite tailor is reportedly British clothier Thomas Mahon. Ive's voice, used in Apple's marketing and promotional videos since 1994, has been noted for its Essex accent and reserved style of speech.

== Influences ==
The work and principles of Dieter Rams, the chief designer of Braun from 1961 until 1995, influenced Ive's work. In Gary Hustwit's documentary film Objectified (2009), Rams says that Apple is one of only a handful of companies existing today that design products according to his ten principles for good design. Ive contributed an essay to a 2011 Rams monograph, Dieter Rams: As Little Design as Possible.

He is also said to have been influenced by the Bauhaus tradition (known for its credos form follows function and less is more), which emerged in Germany during the 1920s and became a staple design approach adopted by the Ulm School of Design during the 1950s. The Bauhaus / Ulm design style was also adopted during the 1980s by luxury automotive brand Audi, which also influenced Jonathan Ive's designs (particularly his work with Apple), and has garnered comparisons in colour stencil, structure, and lighting design.

== Personal life ==
While he was attending secondary school at Walton High School in Stafford he met his future wife, British writer Heather Pegg in 1987. They have two sons. His family resides in the Pacific Heights neighbourhood of San Francisco, California. Their home was purchased for US$17 million in 2012. While at Apple, Ive commuted an hour and a half from San Francisco to Cupertino every day. He said in 2014 that if his work at Apple ever became substandard, he would "make things for [himself], for [his] friends at home instead". Ive owns an additional four homes on California's Belvedere Island, as well as a house in the Cotswolds.

According to the Sunday Times Rich List in 2019, Ive was worth an estimated £192 million.

Ive is known to live a reserved, private home life and to shun publicity.

In March 2025, he was a guest on Desert Island Discs.

=== Automobiles ===
Since his early years in England, Ive has expressed an interest in automobiles and automotive design. While in university he drove a Fiat 500. He frequently attends car shows and exhibitions such as the Goodwood Festival of Speed, where he serves as a jury member for competitions.

It has been reported that Ive's preferred carmakers are British: Aston Martin, Bentley, and Land Rover. Ive has been linked to owning an Aston Martin DB4, Aston Martin DB9, Aston Martin Vanquish, Bentley Brooklands, Bentley Mulsanne, Land Rover Discovery 3, and a Rolls-Royce Silver Cloud.

== Charity work and public service ==
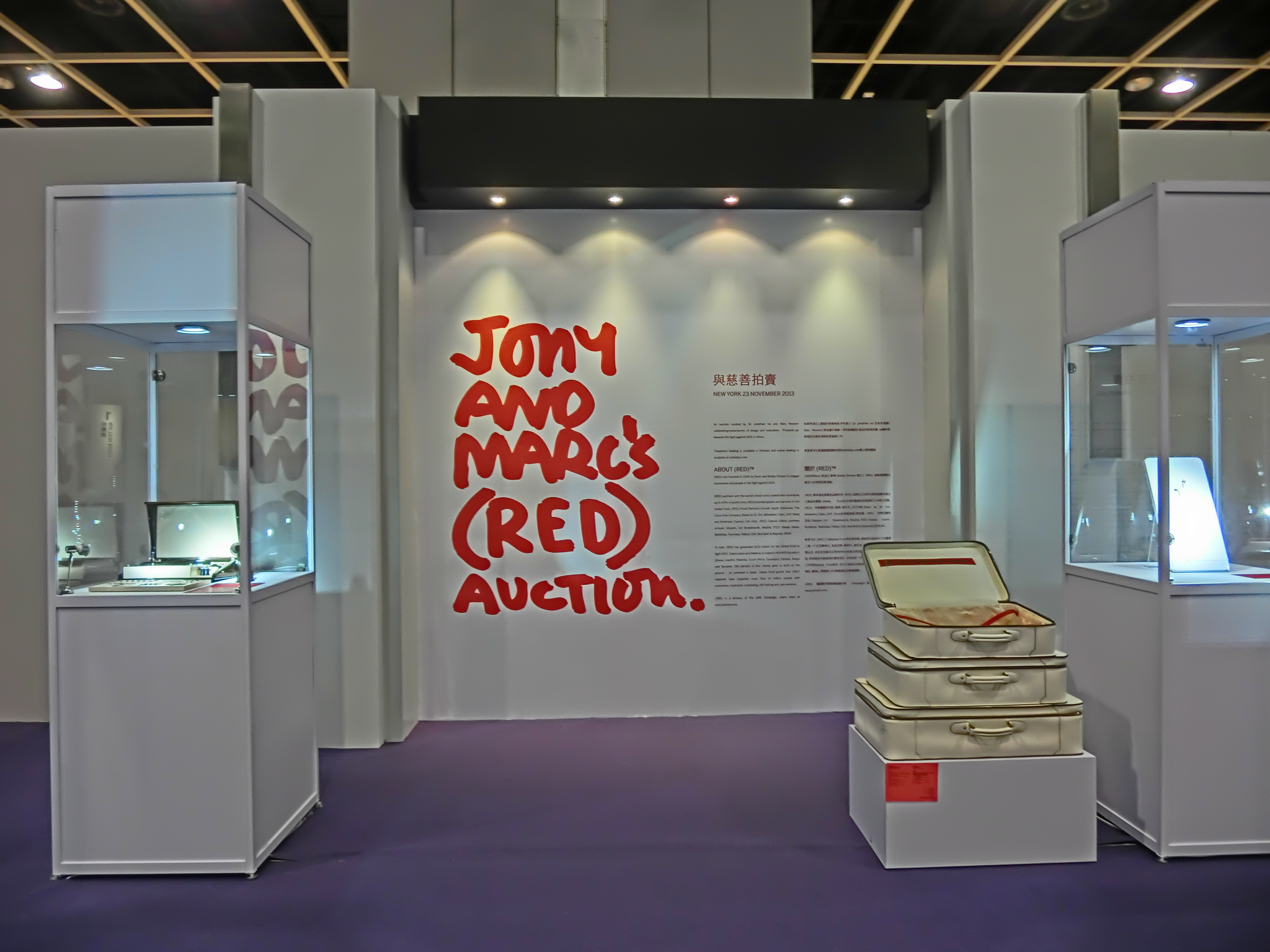
Sotheby's 2013 preview of Jony and Marc's (Red) Auction in Hong Kong

Ive has designed products for charitable causes, including a one-off Leica camera that set a world record auction price and a Jaeger-LeCoultre sports watch — one of only three — for an HIV/AIDS charity. During this auction, Ive and fellow designer Marc Newson raised $13 million for Bono's Product Red charity. With matching from the Bill and Melinda Gates Foundation and additional matching from the UK and US Governments, the total raised was $46 million.

In 2023, Ive redesigned the Red Nose, the symbol of Comic Relief's Red Nose Day, sold to raise money for charity. He also designed the emblem for the coronation of Charles III, which features a rose, thistle, daffodil, and shamrock— traditional symbols representing the four parts of the United Kingdom – in the shape of St Edward's Crown. Ive described the choice of these flowers as being "inspired by King Charles's love of the planet, nature, and his deep concern for the natural world," and that it is intended to refer to the "optimism of spring".

== Honours and awards ==
Throughout his career at Apple, Ive has received nominations and garnered awards for his work. He has been appointed a Royal Designer for Industry (RDI), an Honorary Fellow of the Royal Academy of Engineering (HonFREng), a Commander of the Order of the British Empire (CBE) in 2006 and Knight Commander of the same Order (KBE) in 2012. He has received honorary degrees from the Rhode Island School of Design and California College of the Arts, and made an honorary doctor of the Royal College of Art. On successive Wednesdays in June 2016, Ive was awarded honorary doctorates at the University of Cambridge and the University of Oxford. In 2004, he was named the "Most Influential Person on British Culture" in a BBC poll of cultural writers.

== See also ==
- Apple Inc. design motifs
- Apple Industrial Design Group
- List of English inventors and designers
- Hartmut Esslinger
