= Ammunition Design Group =

American design company

Ammunition
- Type: LLC
- Industry: Product design, Industrial design, Interaction design, Strategy, Visual design, Branding
- Founded: 2007; 19 years ago
- Headquarters: San Francisco, California, United States
- Key people: Robert Brunner, Matt Rolandson
- Number of employees: 50
- Website: ammunitiongroup.com

Ammunition is a San Francisco, CA, design studio founded in 2007 by Robert Brunner. The current managing partners are Robert Brunner and Matt Rolandson. Ammunition was formed after it parted ways from Pentagram (design firm).The company designs hardware, software, and graphic identities for many companies, including Adobe Systems, Beats by Dre, Polaroid Corporation, and Square Inc.

== Notable projects ==
=== Barnes & Noble Nook ===
Ammunition developed the industrial design, user interface and accessory system for the Barnes & Noble Nook e-readers.

=== Smartisan T1 smartphone ===
In May 2014, the company designed the Smartisan T1 and T2 smartphones for China-based Smartisan Technology Co. Ltd.

== Awards ==
Ammunition has been recognized with numerous international design awards from the Industrial Designers Society of America, Red Dot, Core77 Design Awards, D&AD, and the Good Design Awards (Chicago).

- In 2014, Ammunition won a Good Design award in the "Smartphone & Accessory" category for the Smartisan T1 smartphone.
- In 2014, Ammunition announced that their work was recognised in the Product and Graphic categories of the Spark Awards and won 10 awards
- In 2015, Ammunition won an iF Gold Award for the Smartisan T1 smartphone.
- In 2016, Ammunition won the Cooper Hewitt Product Design award for noteworthy projects including Beats By Dr Dre, the Lyft glowstache and the UNICEF Kid Power Band.
- In 2016, Ammunition won an iF Design Award for the Smartisan T2 smartphone
- Ammunition won gold at the 2016 IDSA International Design Excellence Awards
- Ammunition and Eargo won Gold at 2018 International Design Excellence Awards
- In 2020 ammunition x Gantri won AD cleverest Award for the Signal Floor Light
- Ammunition won runner up for the Consumer Technology Award, in the Core 77Design Awards 2024.

In 2021 Ammunition designed the all new trophy for the 10th anniversary of the Innovation by Design awards.

== See also ==
- Pentagram Design
- Product design
