= Thomas Mahon (tailor) =

English tailor and blogger

Thomas Mahon is an English tailor, noted for outfitting the British royal family and other VIP clients.

== Early life and education ==
Mahon was born in Carlisle, Cumbria, and grew up in the small village of Corby Hill, Cumbria. He was educated at the local village school and went on to the former grammar school, White House in Brampton, Carlisle. He entered the tailoring trade by taking a summer job at bespoke tailors S. Redmayne Ltd. He stayed at Redmayne and completed his apprenticeship whilst studying industrial pattern construction and grading at a local polytechnic. After seven years of training, he left Redmayne for London and furthered his skills as a striker (apprentice cutter) to Dennis Halbery at Anderson & Sheppard of Savile Row.

== Independence and Weblog ==
In 1995, Mahon started Steed Bespoke Tailors, a bespoke tailoring company, with Edwin Deboise, before going independent in 2001. In 2005, he began his weblog English Cut with aid of cartoonist and internet entrepreneur Hugh McLeod to share his knowledge of the traditional tailor's craft.

Mahon's wife, Claire, also studied tailoring, fashion, and design at University College for the Creative Arts at Epsom. Together, they have three sons: Patrick, Francis, and John. In his spare time, Mahon teaches sailing and navigation with the rank of Petty Officer in the Sea Cadet Corps, the UK's Naval Cadet Force.

== Ousted from English Cut ==
In late 2012, Mahon began working with Christian Irving, a long-time colleague who wished to offer a "made-to-measure tailoring service". Mahon began searching for a suitable manufacturer, which he found in Japan. Mahon supervised this new service for the next four years. He visited Japan in May 2017, two months before leaving as founder, head cutter and creative director of English Cut.

In 2015, Mahon was approached to sell a 20% stake in English Cut Ltd to Todd Enright on behalf of White Winston LLC, Boston, MA. Although the purchase was never completed, a loan note from White Winston was enforced as the main creditor on 31 July 2017. Mahon was invited to stay under new terms but left the same day, saying the conditions were "unacceptable".

== Redmayne 1860 ==
Mahon returned as head cutter and creative director of Redmayne Ltd.
