= Robert Brunner =

American industrial designer

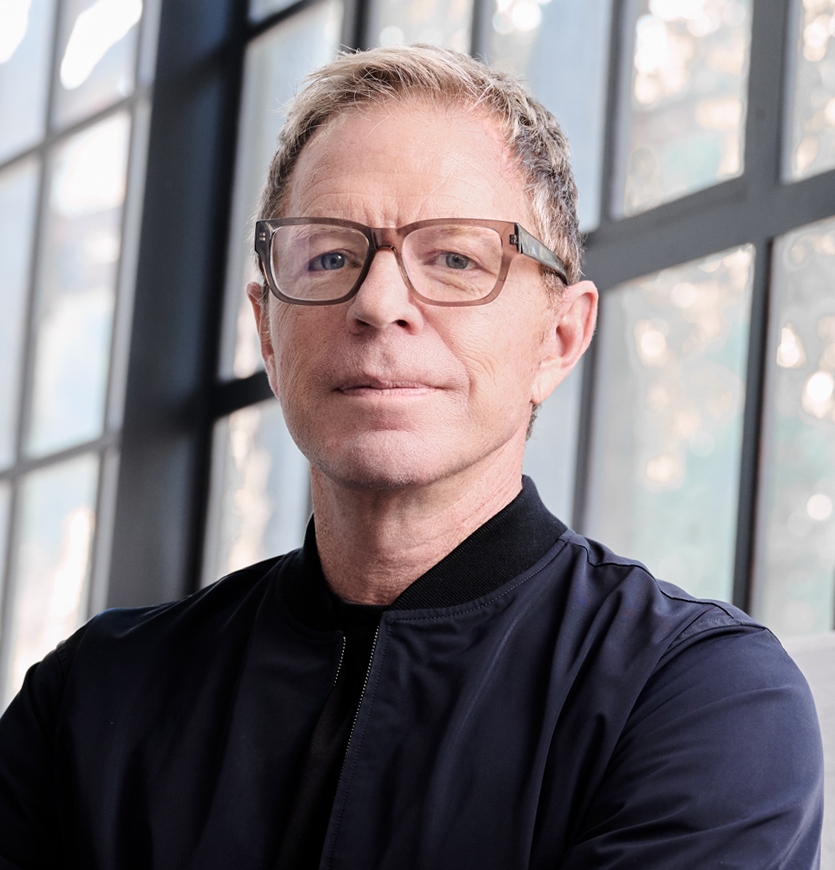
- Brunner in 2026
- Born: 1958 (age 67–68)
- Occupation: Industrial Designer
- Known for: Director of Industrial Design at Apple Computer, Inc. from 1989–1996

Robert Brunner (born 1958) is an American industrial designer. Brunner was the Director of Industrial Design for Apple Computer from 1989 to 1996, and is a founder and current partner at Ammunition Design Group.

== Biography ==
Brunner received a Bachelor of Science degree in Industrial Design from San José State University in 1981.

After working as a designer and project manager at several high technology companies, Brunner went on to co-found Lunar Design in 1984. In 1989, Brunner accepted the position of Director of Industrial Design at Apple Computer, where he provided design and direction for all Apple product lines, including the PowerBook. He was succeeded by Jonathan Ive in 1997. Brunner claims that while with Apple, he hired Ive three times.

In January 1996, he became a partner in the San Francisco office of Pentagram. In 2006, Brunner partnered Alex Siow, founder of San Francisco-based Zephyr Ventilation, to launch outdoor grill design firm Fuego. Emblematic of his relationship with Siow, he designed the Arc Collection of modern range-hoods for Zephyr Ventilation.

By mid-2007 Brunner left Pentagram to start Ammunition Design Group. In 2008, former MetaDesign leaders Brett Wickens and Matt Rolandson joined Ammunition LLC as partners. In 2008, Brunner collaborated with Jimmy Iovine and Dr. Dre to launch Beats by Dre, and is responsible for the design of the company's lines of headphones and speakers including Beats Studio, Powerbeats, Mixr, Solo and Solo Pro as well as the Pill wireless speaker, among others. Brunner stepped down as Beats chief designer after it was acquired by Apple.

Brunner's work has been widely published in North America, Europe, Asia and Australia. His product designs have won 23 IDSA Awards from the Industrial Designers Society of America and Business Week, including 6 best of category awards. His work is included in the permanent collections of the Museum of Modern Art (MoMA), Cooper Hewitt, Smithsonian Design Museum, Indianapolis Museum of Art (IMA), and the San Francisco Museum of Modern Art (SFMoMA).

== See also ==
- Apple Industrial Design Group
- Pentagram
- Ammunition Design Group
