= Hawking Fellowship =

Annual award honouring Stephen Hawking

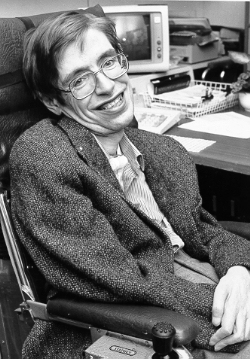
- Stephen Hawking, the namesake and inaugural fellow
- Awarded for: Exceptional contributions to STEM and social discourse
- Location: Cambridge, England
- Presented by: Cambridge Union
- First award: 2017; 9 years ago
- Currently held by: Jocelyn Bell Burnell (2024)
- Website: Official website

The Professor Stephen Hawking Fellowship is a prestigious annual fellowship of the Cambridge Union Society in the University of Cambridge. Awarded to an individual who has made an exceptional contribution to the STEM fields and social discourse, it is unique amongst comparable accolades in that it is conferred by the students of the University (through the Union), rather than the University itself.

Established to celebrate Hawking’s achievements and the close relationship between him and the students of Cambridge, Professor Hawking accepted the inaugural fellowship and delivered the lecture in his last public appearance before his passing. Each honouree visits the Union to commence their tenure as fellow, delivering what is known as ‘The Hawking Lecture’.

== List of Fellows ==
Year	Fellow	Notes
2017	Stephen Hawking	
2018	Jony Ive	
2019	Bill Gates	
2020	Jane Goodall	
2021	Katalin Karikó	
2022	Brian Cox	
2023	The OpenAI Team (Note: Accepted on behalf of the OpenAI team by CEO & Co-Founder Sam Altman.)	
2024	Jocelyn Bell Burnell	
2025	Jensen Huang	
