= Apple Design Awards =

Award ceremony by Apple

- Native name: ADAs
- Description: Recognizing innovation and excellence in software and hardware
- Country: United States
- Presented by: Apple Inc.
- Website: https://developer.apple.com/design/awards/

The Apple Design Awards (ADAs) is an event hosted by Apple Inc. at its annual Worldwide Developers Conference. The purpose of the event is to recognize the best and most innovative Macintosh and iOS software and hardware produced by independent developers, as well as the best and most creative uses of Apple's products. The ADAs are awarded in categories that vary each year. The awards have been presented annually since 1997. For the first two years of their existence, they were known as the "Human Interface Design Excellence Awards" (HIDE Awards).

Since 2003, the physical award given to those recognized at the awards event bore an Apple logo that would glow when touched. The trophy is a 3.9 in (9.9 cm) long aluminum cube which weighs 55.5 oz (1.57 kg). These were engineered and built by Sparkfactor Design.

== Winners ==
=== 1997 ===
1997 Human Interface Design Excellence (HIDE) Award
Category	Place	Product	Developed by
Most Innovative	1st	Kai's Power GOO 1.0	MetaTools, Inc.
Most Innovative	2nd	Starry Night Deluxe 2.0	Sienna Software, Inc.
Most Innovative	3rd	YOYO Telephone Manager for Macintosh 1.5.1	Big Island Communications, Inc
Most Elegant	1st	Starry Night Deluxe 2.0	Sienna Software, Inc.
Most Elegant	2nd	CalcWorks 1.5.2	John Brochu
Most Elegant	3rd	AMBER: Journeys Beyond	Changeling, Inc.
Best Look & Feel	1st	YOYO Telephone Manager for Macintosh 1.5.1	Big Island Communications, Inc.
Best Look & Feel	2nd	Adobe Illustrator 6.0	Adobe Systems, Inc.
Best Look & Feel	3rd	Symantec Visual Cafe for Macintosh 1.0	Symantec Corp.
Best Overall Design	1st	YOYO Telephone Manager for Macintosh 1.5.1	Big Island Communications, Inc.
Best Overall Design	2nd	Starry Night Deluxe 2.0	Sienna Software, Inc.
Best Overall Design	3rd	Kai's Power GOO 1.0	MetaTools, Inc.

=== 1998 ===
1998
Category	Place	Product	Developed by
Most Innovative	1st	Flash 2	Macromedia
Most Innovative	2nd	Legacy of Time: The Journeyman Project 3	Presto Studios, Inc.
Most Innovative	3rd	Office 98 Macintosh Edition	Microsoft Corporation
Best Look & Feel	1st	Preflight Pro 1.0	Extensis Corporation
Best Look & Feel	2nd	PlusMaker 1.0.1	Alsoft, Inc.
Best Look & Feel	3rd	Virtual PC 2.0	Connectix Corporation
Best Apple Technology Adoption	1st	Stuffit Delux 4.5	Aladdin Systems, Inc.
Best Apple Technology Adoption	2nd	PowerMail 2.0	CTM Development
Best Apple Technology Adoption	3rd	FaceSpan 3.0	Digital Technology International

=== 1999 ===
1999
Category	Place	Product	Developed by
Best New Product	1st	REALbasic 1.0	REAL Software
Best New Product	2nd	Disk Warrior 1.0	Alsoft
Most Innovative	1st	Disk Warrior 1.0	Alsoft
Most Innovative	2nd	REALbasic 1.0	REAL Software
Best Macintosh User Experience	1st	Food Chain 1.0	Cajun Games
Best Macintosh User Experience	2nd	REALbasic 1.0	REAL Software
Best Apple Technology Adoption	1st	Cutie Mascot Jr. 1.5	Koshin Graphic Systems
Best Apple Technology Adoption	2nd	Virtual Game Station	Connectix

=== 2000 ===
2000
Category	Place	Product	Developed by
Best New Product	1st	ViaVoice Millennium Edition	IBM
Best New Product	2nd	Thinking Home 1.0	Always Thinking, Inc.
Most Innovative Product	1st	LiveStage Professional	Totally Hip Software Inc.
Most Innovative Product	2nd	Thinking Home 1.0	Always Thinking, Inc.
Best Look & Feel	1st	Math Mysteries 1.0	Tom Snyder Productions
Best Look & Feel	2nd	REALbasic 2.0	REAL Software, Inc.
Best Apple Technology Adoption	1st	Thinking Home 1.0	Always Thinking, Inc.
Best Apple Technology Adoption	2nd	LiveStage Professional	Totally Hip Software Inc.

=== 2001 ===
2001
Category	Place	Product	Developed by
Best New Mac OS X Product	1st	OmniWeb 4.0	The Omni Group
Best New Mac OS X Product	2nd	Xtools 1.0.3	Tenon Intersystems
Most Innovative Mac OS X Product	1st	Xtools 1.0.3	Tenon Intersystems
Most Innovative Mac OS X Product	2nd	MYOB AccountEdge 1.0	MYOB US, Inc.
Best Mac OS X User Experience	1st	OmniWeb 4.0	The Omni Group
Best Mac OS X User Experience	2nd	Drive 10 1.0.0	Micromat, Inc.
Best Mac OS X Technology Adoption	1st	AutoCompleter 1.0	Catchy Software
Best Mac OS X Technology Adoption	2nd	REALbasic 3.2	REAL Software, Inc.

=== 2002 ===
2002
Category	Place	Product	Developed by
Best New Mac OS X Product	1st	Toon Boom Studio 1.1	Toon Boom
Best New Mac OS X Product	2nd	Marketcircle DayLite 1.0.1	Marketcircle Inc.
Most Innovative Mac OS X Product	1st	Watson 1.5	Karelia Software, LLC
Most Innovative Mac OS X Product	2nd	Toon Boom Studio 1.1	Toon Boom
Best Mac OS X User Experience	1st	OmniGraffle 2.0	The Omni Group
Best Mac OS X User Experience	2nd	STX 1.0	Salon Transcripts
Best Mac OS X Technology Adoption	1st	OmniGraffle 2.0	The Omni Group
Best Mac OS X Technology Adoption	2nd	Vektor 3 3.1.3	Manfred Schubert
Best Mac OS X Open Source Port	1st	TeXShop 1.19	Richard Koch, Mathematics Department, University of Oregon in collaboration with Gerben Wierda and Dirk Olmes Mathematics Department, University of Oregon
Best Mac OS X Open Source Port	2nd	SIDekick 1.1	Axel Wefers
Best Mac OS X Student Product	1st	MacJournal 2.1	Dan Schimpf
Best Mac OS X Student Product	2nd	CanCombineIcons 2.1.0	David Remahl

=== 2003 ===
2003
Category	Place	Product	Developed by
Best Mac OS X Product (Best of Show)	1st	Salling Clicker 1.5	Salling Software
Best Mac OS X Product (Best of Show)	2nd	World Book 2003 Jaguar Edition	Software MacKiev
Most Innovative Mac OS X Product	1st	Salling Clicker 1.5	Salling Software
Most Innovative Mac OS X Product	2nd	Starry Night Pro 4.0	SPACE.com Canada
Best Mac OS X User Experience	1st	Starry Night Backyard 4.0	SPACE.com Canada
Best Mac OS X User Experience	2nd	Transmit 2	Panic Inc.
Best Mac OS X Technology Adoption	1st	World Book 2003 Jaguar Edition	Software MacKiev
Best Mac OS X Technology Adoption	2nd	Spell Catcher X	Evan Gross
Best Mac OS X Student Product	1st	Hydra 1.0.1 (now SubEthaEdit)	Martin Ott, Martin Pittenauer, Dominik Wagner, and Ulrich Bauer
Best Mac OS X Student Product	2nd	SignalScope 1.0.5	Benjamin Faber
Best Mac OS X Use of Open Source	1st	Fugu	University of Michigan
Best Mac OS X Use of Open Source	2nd	VLC 0.5.3	Samuel Hocevar
Best Mac OS X Server Solution	1st	iNquiry 1.0	BioTeam
Best Mac OS X Server Solution	2nd	Radmind 0.8.4	University of Michigan
Best QuickTime Content Created by a Student	1st	Drive By Punch	Stephen Mebs
Best QuickTime Content Created by a Student	2nd	Nature and Water	Mario Palomera
Best QuickTime Content Created by an Individual	1st	OICs MusicBox Presenting Superfluid	Robert West and Michael Schaff
Best QuickTime Content Created by an Individual	2nd	Paraphonic Midnight Sounds	Jonathan Puckey, Andreas Pihlström & Linus Wahlstedt
Best QuickTime Content Created by a Company	1st	BMW Films Campaign—"The Hire" Enhanced Film Experience	Fallon Worldwide
Best QuickTime Content Created by a Company	2nd	The Beautiful Mistake QuickTime Player	Tubatomic Studio

=== 2004 ===
2004
Category	Place	Product	Developed by
Best Mac OS X Product	1st	Big Bang Chess 1.0	Freeverse Software
Best Mac OS X Product	2nd	Unison (usenet client) 1.0.2a	Panic Inc.
Best Product New to Mac OS	1st	Contribute 2	Macromedia Inc.
Best Product New to Mac OS	2nd	GraphViz 1.12 (v11)	Pixelglow Software
Most Innovative Mac OS X Product	1st	ToySight 1.0	Freeverse Software
Most Innovative Mac OS X Product	2nd	SwordfishExpress 2.0	buyolympia.com
Best Mac OS X User Experience	1st	Unison 1.0.2a	Panic Inc.
Best Mac OS X User Experience	2nd	SOHO Business Cards 1.0	Chronos LLC
Best Mac OS X Technology Adoption	1st	Big Bang Chess 1.0	Freeverse Software
Best Mac OS X Technology Adoption	2nd	PulpFiction 1.0	Freshly Squeezed Software
Best Mac OS X Open Source Product	1st	GraphViz 1.12 (v11)	Pixelglow Software
Best Mac OS X Open Source Product	2nd	PureFTPd Manager 1.2	Jean-Matthieu Schaffhauser
Best Mac OS X Server Solution	1st	iNquiry 4.05d	The BioTeam
Best Mac OS X Server Solution	2nd	gridMathematica 1.1	Wolfram Research, Inc.
Best Mac OS X Entertainment Product	1st	Unreal Tournament 2004 for Macintosh v1.0	MacSoft
Best Mac OS X Entertainment Product	2nd	Warcraft III: The Frozen Throne	Blizzard Entertainment
Best Mac OS X Scientific Computing Solution	1st	Mac TetrUSS v010804	NASA Langley Research Center
Best Mac OS X Scientific Computing Solution	2nd	Volocity 2.6.1	Improvision
Best Mac OS X Scientific Computing Solution	Honorable Mention	IBM XL Fortran Advanced Edition 8.1	IBM
Best Mac OS X Student Product	1st	4Peaks	Alexander Griekspoor, Tom Groothuis, Oncology Graduate School Amsterdam
Best Mac OS X Student Product	2nd	Curvus Pro X	Simon Bovet, University of Zurich, Switzerland
Best QuickTime Content for Education	1st	Conflict Lab's Rotunda	Conflict Lab, Inc.
Best QuickTime Content for Education	2nd	Commanding Heights	WGBH Interactive
Best QuickTime Content for Promotion	1st	Robbie Williams "Knebworth" QuickTime Promo	Bluish, Ltd.
Best QuickTime Content for Promotion	2nd	Yamashiro Restaurant Virtual Tour	Axis Images
Best QuickTime Content for Entertainment	1st	FreeCaster Sports	Barsark AB
Best QuickTime Content for Entertainment	2nd	Bright and Shine	Antonio Hui
Best Performance Demo of a Shipping Product	1st	ATI Technologies	Inc, ATI Animusic's Pipe Dream Demo
Best Performance Demo of a Shipping Product	2nd	ATI Technologies	Inc, ATI Rendering with Natural Light Demo
Most Innovative Apple Technology Performance Demo	1st	Advanced Analytic System Design	Inc., Freefall
Most Innovative Apple Technology Performance Demo	2nd	Symbiot	Symbiot iSIMS

=== 2005 ===
2005
Category	Place	Product	Developed by
Best Mac OS X Tiger Technology Adoption	1st	Transmit 3.2	Panic, Inc.
Best Mac OS X Tiger Technology Adoption	2nd	iScale 1.7	equinux
Best Mac OS X Tiger Technology Adoption	Special Mention	OmniOutliner 3.0.3	The Omni Group
Best Mac OS X User Experience	1st	Delicious Library 1.5	Delicious Monster
Best Mac OS X User Experience	2nd	3D Weather Globe & Atlas Max OS X Edition	Software MacKiev
Best Product New to Mac OS X	1st	Comic Life 1.1	plasq
Best Product New to Mac OS X	2nd	Delicious Library 1.5	Delicious Monster
Best Product New to Mac OS X	Special Mention	eDrawings for Mac 2006	SolidWorks
Best Mac OS X Entertainment Product	1st	World of Warcraft 1.3.1	Blizzard Entertainment
Best Mac OS X Entertainment Product	2nd	Jammin' Racer 1.01	DanLabGames
Best Use of Open Source	1st	OsiriX 1.6.4	Antoine Rosset, Osman Ratib, Lance Pysher, David Davies-Payne, Luca Spadola, Bruce Rakes
Best Use of Open Source	2nd	Blender 2.36	Blender Foundation
Best Use of Open Source	Special Mention	AdiumX	Evan Schoenberg, Adam Iser
Best Mac OS X Scientific Computing Solution	1st	DataTank 2005-5	Visual Data Tools, Inc.
Best Mac OS X Scientific Computing Solution	2nd	OsiriX 1.6.4	Antoine Rosset, Osman Ratib, Lance Pysher, David Davies-Payne, Luca Spadola, Bruce Rakes
Best Mac OS X Scientific Computing Solution	Special Mention	Mathematica	Wolfram Research
Best Mac OS X Server Solution	1st	Quicksilver InfiniBand Software for Mac OS X	SilverStorm Technologies (now QLogic), Small Tree Communications
Best Mac OS X Server Solution	2nd	Elektron 1.0.1	Corriente Networks LLC
Best Mac OS X Student Product	1st	GraphClick	Simon Bovet
Best Mac OS X Student Product	2nd	iMap 3.1	Peter Schols
Best Mac OS X Student Product	Special Mention	Sonic Birth	Antoine Missout

=== 2006 ===
2006
Category	Place	Product	Developed by
Best Mac OS X User Experience	1st	iSale 3.1	equinux
Best Mac OS X User Experience	2nd	FotoMagico 1.7	Boinx Software
Best OS X Graphics	1st	modo	Luxology
Best OS X Graphics	2nd	Unity	Unity Technologies
Best Developer Tool	1st	TextMate 1.5	Allan Odgaard
Best Developer Tool	2nd	F-Script	Philippe Mougin
Best Scientific Computing Solution	1st	EnzymeX 3.1	Mekentosj
Best Scientific Computing Solution	2nd	FuzzMeasure Pro 2	Christopher Liscio
Best Game	1st	The Sims 2	Electronic Arts
Best Game	2nd	WingNuts 2	Freeverse
Best Mac OS X Student Product	1st	Lineform	Freeverse
Best Mac OS X Student Product	2nd	PhotoPresenter	Boinx Software
Best Widget	1st	iClip Lite	
Best Widget	2nd	WeatherBug Local Weather	
Best Automator Workflow	1st	Build Real Estate Catalog/Ultimate Productivity Action Pack	
Best Automator Workflow	2nd	Lecture Recording Workflow 1.2	University of Michigan School of Dentistry, Trek Glowacki

=== 2007 ===
2007
Category	Place	Product	Developed by
Best Mac OS X Leopard Application	1st	Delicious Library 2 (alpha)	Delicious Monster
Best Mac OS X Leopard Application	2nd	iBank 3.0a	IGG Software
Best Mac OS X User Experience	1st	Coda 1.0	Panic Software
Best Mac OS X User Experience	2nd	Sandvox 1.2	Karelia Software
Best Mac OS X Developer Tool	1st	CSSEdit 2.5	MacRabbit
Best Mac OS X Developer Tool	2nd	rooSwitch 1.1.8	roobasoft
Best Mac OS X Dashboard Widget	1st	BART Widget	Bret Victor
Best Mac OS X Dashboard Widget	2nd	PEMDAS 1.1	Michael Filippone
Best Mac OS X Scientific Computing Solution	1st	Papers 1.0	mekentosj.com
Best Mac OS X Scientific Computing Solution	2nd	SingleCrystal 1.3	CrystalMaker Software
Best Mac OS X Game	1st	World of Warcraft: The Burning Crusade	Blizzard Entertainment
Best Mac OS X Game	2nd	Wacky Mini Golf! 1.01	DanLabGames
Best Mac OS X Student Product	1st	Picturesque 1.0	Acquilia
Best Mac OS X Student Product	2nd	Pathway 1.0	Dennis Lorson

=== 2008 ===
2008
Category	Place	Product	Developed by
Best Leopard Student Product:	1st	Squirrel	Axel Péju
Best Leopard Student Product:	2nd	Flow 1.0.1	Brian Amerige
Best Mac OS X Leopard Graphics and Media Application	1st	ScreenFlow	Vara Software Ltd.
Best Mac OS X Leopard Graphics and Media Application	2nd	FotoMagico	Boinx Software Ltd.
Best Mac OS X Leopard User Experience	1st	Macnification	Orbicule
Best Mac OS X Leopard User Experience	2nd	Checkout	Werck BV
Best Mac OS X Leopard Game	1st	Guitar Hero III: Legends of Rock	Aspyr Media
Best Mac OS X Leopard Game	2nd	Command & Conquer 3: Tiberium Wars	Electronic Arts
Best Mac OS X Leopard Application	1st	ScreenFlow	Vara Software Limited
Best Mac OS X Leopard Application	2nd	Bee Docs Timeline 3D Edition	Bee Documents
Best iPhone Web App	1st	Remember the Milk	Remember the Milk
Best iPhone Web App	2nd	AP Mobile News Network	The Associated Press
Best iPhone Game Winner	1st	Enigmo	Pangea Software
Best iPhone Entertainment Application Winner	1st	AOL Radio	AOL LLC
Best iPhone Social Networking Application Winner	1st	Twitterrific	The Iconfactory
Best iPhone Productivity Application Winner	1st	OmniFocus	The Omni Group
Best iPhone Healthcare & Fitness Application Winner	1st	MIM	MIMvista Corp.

=== 2009 ===
2009
Category	Product	Developed by
Mac OS X Leopard Developer Showcase	Billings	Marketcircle Inc.
Mac OS X Leopard Developer Showcase	BoinxTV v1.3	Boinx Software
Mac OS X Leopard Developer Showcase	Things v1.1	Cultured Code
Mac OS X Leopard Developer Showcase	Versions v1.0.3	Pico and Sofa
Best Mac OS X Student Product	Fontcase v1.1.3	Pieter Omvlee
iPhone Developer Showcase	MLB.com At Bat 2009 v1.0.1	MLB.com
iPhone Developer Showcase	Postage v1.0	RogueSheep
iPhone Developer Showcase	Topple 2 v1.1	ngmoco:)
iPhone Developer Showcase	Tweetie v1.3.1	atebits LLC
Best iPhone Student App	Wooden Labyrinth 3D v1.2.1	Elias Pietilä
Best iPhone OS 3.0 Beta App	AccuTerra v1.0.0 Beta	AccuTerra

=== 2010 ===
2010
Category	Product	Developed by
Best iPad apps	The Financial Times	The Financial Times Ltd.
Best iPad apps	TabToolkit	Agile Partners
Best iPad apps	Flight Control HD	Firemint
Best iPad apps	Star Walk for iPad - Interactive Astronomy Guide	Vito Technology, Inc.
Best iPad apps	Pinball HD	Gameprom
Best iPhone apps	Doodle Jump	Lima Sky LLC
Best iPhone apps	Brushes	Steve Sprang
Best iPhone apps	Articles	Sophiestication Software
Best iPhone apps	20 Minute Meals - Jamie Oliver	Zolmo
Best iPhone apps	Real Racing	Firemint

=== 2011 ===
2011
Category	Product	Developed by
Student	Grades 2	Tapity
Student	Pennant	Vargatron
Student	Pulse News	Alphonso Labs
iPhone	Cut the Rope	Chillingo
iPhone	Golfscape GPS Rangefinder	Shotzoom Software
iPhone	Infinity Blade	Chair Entertainment
iPad	Osmos	Hemisphere Games
iPad	Our Choice	Push Pop Press
iPad	djay	algoriddim
Mac	Capo	SuperMegaUltraGroovy
Mac	Pixelmator	Pixelmator Team Ltd.
Mac	Anomaly: Warzone Earth	11 bit studios

=== 2012 ===
2012
Category	Product	Developed by
Student	daWindci	Mimimi Productions
Student	Little Star	BiBoBox Studio
iPhone	Where's My Water	Disney Interactive Studios
iPhone	Jetpack Joyride	Halfbrick Studios
iPhone	National Parks by National Geographic	National Geographic Society
iPad	Paper	FiftyThree, Inc.
iPad	Bobo Explores Light	Game Collage, LLC
iPad	DM1 - The Drum Machine	Fingerlab
Mac	Deus Ex: Human Revolution	Feral Interactive
Mac	LIMBO	Playdead
Mac	Sketch	Bohemian Coding

=== 2013 ===
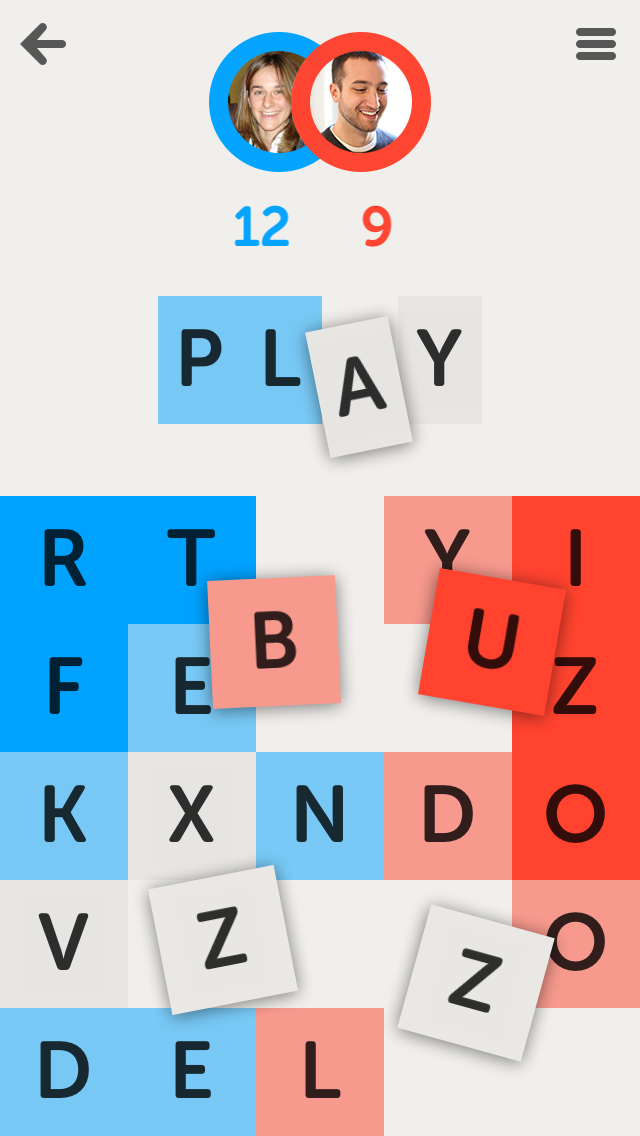
Letterpress (2012)

2013
Category	Product	Developed by
Mac & iOS	WWF Together	World Wildlife Fund
Mac & iOS	Procreate	Savage Interactive Pty Ltd.
Mac & iOS	Badland	Frogmind
Mac & iOS	Yahoo! Weather	Yahoo!
Mac & iOS	Letterpress	atebits
Mac & iOS	Ridiculous Fishing	Vlambeer
Mac & iOS	Sky Gamblers: Storm Raiders	Atypical Games
Mac & iOS	Coda 2	Panic, Inc.
Mac & iOS	Evernote	Evernote Corporation
Student	Finish	Ryan Orbuch and Michael Hansen
Student	Mosaic	Ishaan Gulrajani, Alex List, and Zain Shah

==== Student Scholarship Design Award Winners ====
- Louis Harboe
- Bryan Keller
- Puck Meerburg

=== 2014 ===
2014
Category	Product	Developed by
Mac & iOS	Leo's Fortune	1337 and Senri
Mac & iOS	Day One	Bloom Built
Mac & iOS	Blek	kunabi brother
Mac & iOS	Yahoo! News Digest	Yahoo!
Mac & iOS	Threes!	Sirvo
Mac & iOS	Cinemagraph Pro	Flixel Photos
Mac & iOS	Device 6	Simogo
Mac & iOS	Storehouse-Visual Storytelling	Storehouse Media
Mac & iOS	Sky Guide	Fifth Star Labs
Mac & iOS	Monument Valley	ustwo Studio
Student	PanoPerfect	HalfPeeled LLC and TwoBros
Student	Addimal Adventure	Teachley

=== 2015 ===
2015
Category	Product	Developed by
Mac & iOS	Shadowmatic	Triada Studio
Mac & iOS	Metamorphabet	Vectorpark, Inc.
Mac & iOS	Robinhood	Robinhood Markets
Mac & iOS	Affinity Designer	Serif Europe
Mac & iOS	Crossy Road	Hipster Whale Pty Ltd.
Mac & iOS	Fantaal 2	Flexibits Inc.
Mac & iOS	Workflow	DeskConnect, Inc.
Mac & iOS	Does Not Commute	Mediocre AB
Mac & iOS	Vainglory	Super Evil Megacorp
Mac & iOS	Pacemaker	Pacemaker Music AB
Student	Elementary Minute	Klemens Strasser
Student	jump-O	Gabriel Mathias Rocha and Victor Lappas Giménez

=== 2016 ===
2016
Category	Product	Developed by
Mac & iOS	Complete Anatomy	3D4Medical
Mac & iOS	Streaks	Zervaas Enterprises
Mac & iOS	Zova	Personal Trainer ZOVA
Mac & iOS	Frame.io - Video Review and Collaboration	Frame.io
Mac & iOS	Ulysses	The Soulmen GbR
Mac & iOS	Chameleon Run	Noodlecake Studios Inc.
Mac & iOS	Lara Croft GO	Square Enix Montreal
Mac & iOS	INKS.	State of Play Games
Mac & iOS	Auxy Music Creation	Auxy
Mac & iOS	djay Pro	algoriddim GmbH
Student	Linum	Joaquín Ramírez Vila
Student	Dividr	Josh Deichmann, Patrick Pistor, and Erik Lydick

=== 2017 ===
2017
Product	Developed by
Blackbox	Ryan McLeod
Splitter Critters	RAC7 Games
Mushroom 11	Untame
Old Man's Journey	Broken Rules
Severed	DrinkBox Studios Inc.
Lake: Coloring Books	Lake d.o.o
Bear	Shiny Frog di Matteo Rattotti e C. S.N.C.
Kitchen Stories	AJNS New Media GmbH
Things 3	Cultured Code GmBH & Co. KG
Elk	Clean Shaven Apps Pte. Ltd.
Enlight	Lightricks Inc.
Airmail 3	Bloop

=== 2018 ===
2018
Product	Developed by
Agenda	Momenta B.V.
BANDIMAL	YATATOY
Calzy	Raja Vijayaraman
iTranslate Converse	iTranslate
Triton Sponge	Gauss Surgical, Inc.
Florence	Mountains
Inside	Playdead
Alto's Odyssey	Snowman
Frost	kunabi brother
Oddmar	Mobge Ltd

=== 2019 ===
2019
Product	Developed by
Ordia	Loju LTD
Flow by Moleskine	Moleskine Srl
The Gardens Between	The Voxel Agents
Asphalt 9: Legends	Gameloft
Pixelmator Photo	Pixelmator Team
ELOH	Broken Rules
Butterfly iQ - Ultrasound	Butterfly Network
Thumper: Pocket Edition	Drool LLC
HomeCourt - The Basketball App	NEX Team Inc.

=== 2020 ===
2020
Product	Developed by
Shapr3D	Shapr 3D ZRT
Looom	iorama.studio
StaffPad	StaffPad Ltd.
Darkroom	Bergen Co
Sayonara Wild Hearts	Simogo and Annapurna Interactive
Song of Bloom	Philipp Stollenmayer
Where Cards Fall	The Game Band and Snowman
Sky: Children of the Light	Thatgamecompany

=== 2021 ===
2021
Category	Product	Developed by
Inclusivity	HoloVista	Aconite
Inclusivity	Voice Dream Reader	Voice Dream LLC
Delight and Fun	Little Orpheus	The Chinese Room
Delight and Fun	Pok Pok Playroom	Pok Pok
Interaction	Bird Alone	George Batchelor
Interaction	CARROT Weather	Brian Mueller, Grailr LLC
Social Impact	Alba: A Wildlife Adventure	ustwo games
Social Impact	Be My Eyes	Be My Eyes
Visuals and Graphics	Genshin Impact	miHoYo Limited
Visuals and Graphics	Loóna	Loóna Inc
Innovation	League of Legends: Wild Rift	Riot Games
Innovation	NaadSadhana	Sandeep Ranade

=== 2022 ===
2022
Category	Product	Developed by
Inclusivity	Procreate	Savage Interactive (Australia)
Inclusivity	Wylde Flowers	Studio Drydock (Australia)
Delight and Fun	(Not Boring) Habits	Andy Works LLC (United States)
Delight and Fun	Overboard!	inkle (United Kingdom)
Interaction	Slopes	Breakpoint Studio (United States)
Interaction	A Musical Story	Glee-Cheese Studio (France)
Social Impact	Rebel Girls	Rebel Girls Inc. (United States)
Social Impact	Gibbon: Beyond the Trees	Broken Rules (Austria)
Visuals and Graphics	Halide Mark II	Lux Optics (United States)
Visuals and Graphics	Lego Star Wars: Castaways	Gameloft (Canada)
Innovation	Odio	Volst (The Netherlands)
Innovation	Marvel Future Revolution	Netmarble Corp. (South Korea)

=== 2023 ===
2023
Category	Product	Developed by
Inclusivity	Universe	Universe Exploration Company
Inclusivity	stitch.	Lykke Studios
Delight and Fun	Duolingo	Duolingo, Inc.
Delight and Fun	Afterplace	Evan Kice
Interaction	Flighty	Flighty LLC
Interaction	Railbound	Afterburner
Social Impact	Headspace	Headspace
Social Impact	Endling	HandyGames
Visuals and Graphics	Any Distance	Any Distance Inc
Visuals and Graphics	Resident Evil Village	CAPCOM Co., Ltd.
Innovation	SwingVision	SwingVision Inc.
Innovation	MARVEL SNAP	Second Dinner

=== 2024 ===
2024
Category	Product	Developed by
Inclusivity	oko	AYES
Inclusivity	Crayola Adventures	Red Games Co.
Delight and Fun	Bears Gratitude	Isuru Wanasinghe
Delight and Fun	NYT Games	The New York Times Company
Interaction	Crouton	Devin Davies
Interaction	Rytmos	Floppy Club
Social Impact	Gentler Streak Fitness Tracker	Gentler Stories
Social Impact	The Wreck	The Pixel Hunt
Visuals and Graphics	Rooms	Things, Inc.
Visuals and Graphics	Lies of P	NEOWIZ
Innovation	Procreate Dreams	Procreate
Innovation	Lost in Play	Happy Juice Games
Spatial Computing	djay pro - DJ App & AI Mixer	algoriddim GmbH
Spatial Computing	Blackbox	Shapes and Stories

=== 2025 ===
2025
Category	Product	Developed by
Inclusivity	Speechify	Speechify
Inclusivity	Art of Fauna	Klemens Strasser
Delight and Fun	CapWords	HappyPlan Tech
Delight and Fun	Balatro	LocalThunk
Interaction	Taobao	Zhejiang Taobao Network
Interaction	Dredge	Black Salt Games
Social Impact	Watch Duty	Sherwood Forestry Service
Social Impact	Neva	Devolver Digital
Visuals and Graphics	Feather: Draw in 3D	Sketchsoft
Visuals and Graphics	Infinity Nikki	Infold Games
Innovation	Play	Rabbit 3 Times
Innovation	PBJ — The Musical	Philipp Stollenmayer

2026
Category	Product	Developed by
Inclusivity	Guitar Wiz	Bijoy Thangaraj
Inclusivity	Pine Hearts	Hyper Luminal Games Limited
Delight and Fun	grug	Ocho
Delight and Fun	Is This Seat Taken	Poti Poti Studio
Interaction	Moonlitt: Moon Phase Tracker	Flipping Hues Srls
Interaction	Sago Mini Jinja's Garden	Sago Mini
Social Impact	Pimary: News in Depth	Wood Metal Rocks LLC
Social Impact	Consume Me	Jenny Jiao Hsia and AP Thomson
Visuals and Graphics	Tide Guide: Charts & Tables	Condor Digital
Visuals and Graphics	Cyberpunk 2077: Ultimate Edition	CD Projekt
Innovation	NBA: Live Games & Scores	NBA Media Ventures, LLC
Innovation	Blue Prince	Dogubomb
