= Airmail (disambiguation) =

Airmail (or air mail) is a mail transport service.

Airmail or Air Mail may also refer to:

- Airmail (album), a 2000 album by Epicure
- Air Mail (magazine), a digital publication founded in 2019
- Air Mail (album), a 1981 album by Air
- Air Mail (film), a 1932 American film by John Ford
- Airmail (fresco), a 1937 American fresco painting by Edwin Boyd Johnson
- The Air Mail, a 1925 silent film directed by Irvin Willat
- Air Mail (video game), a 2012 iOS game
- Airmail (email client), an email client for iPhone and Mac OS X
- Airmail (cocktail)
