= Publishing Innovation Award =

Digital Book World Publishing Innovation Award is a literary award sponsored by the magazine Digital Book World for innovation in electronic books. "The Publishing Innovation Awards will honor those making strides in this nascent medium." It was announced in 2010 with the inaugural award given January 24, 2011. Award categories include Fiction, Nonfiction, Children's, Reference and Comics. Each category has one unique judge who chooses the winner from a finalist list of three contenders.

== Winners ==
=== 2011 ===
The inaugural award were announced January 24, 2011.

- Fiction: Dracula: The Official Stoker Family Edition, created by PadWorx Digital Media
- Non-Fiction: Logos Bible Software, created by Logos Bible Software
- Children's: A Story Before Bed, created by Jackson Fish Marke
- Reference: Star Walk for iPad, created by Vito Technology
- Comics: Robot 13, created by Robot Comics (by Thomas Hall and Daniel Bradford)

=== 2012 ===
The awards were announced January 23 in New York City at the Digital Book World Conference.

- App Comics/Graphic Novels: The Wormworld Saga, Robot Media
- App Fiction: Ayn Rand’s Atlas Shrugged, Penguin USA
- App Juvenile: Cinderella App, Nosy Crow
- App Non-Fiction: The Magic of Reality for iPad, Random House
- App Reference/Academic: British Library 19th Century Historical Collection, Bibliolabs
- Digital-First Ebook: Desserts – Discover the dessert recipes 20 million home cooks picked as America’s best, Allrecipes.com, Inc.
- Ebook Children’s: Five Little Pumpkins, HarperFestival/Zuuka
- Ebook Fiction: Brad Meltzer’s The Inner Circle and Preston & Child’s Cabinet of Curiosities, Grand Central Publishing/Hachette Book Group
- Ebook Non-Fiction: AAA Las Vegas eTourBook Guide, AAA
- Ebook Reference/Academic Meggs' History of Graphic Design, 5th Edition, John Wiley & Sons
- Enhanced Ebook: Eva Scrivo on Beauty, Atria Books/Simon & Schuster
- Transmedia Project: Decoded by Jay-Z, Random House, Inc., Random House Publishing Group

=== 2013 ===
The awards were announced January 16, 2013 in New York City at the Digital Book World Conference.

- App Fiction: iPoe – The Interactive and Illustrated Edgar Allan Poe Collection (Play Creatividad, S.L.)
- App Non-Fiction: Wine Simplified: Navigate Wine with Confidence (Open Air Publishing Inc.)
- App Juvenile: Dr. Seuss's The Cat in the Hat Color & Create! (Random House Children’s Books)
- App Reference/Academic: World Development Report 2012 app for iPad (The World Bank)
- App Comic/Graphic: 2084 (Thunder Cloud Studios LLC)
- Ebook Children's: The Dinosaur that Pooped Christmas (Random House)
- EBook Fiction: Shuffle (Tonto Books)
- Ebook Non-Fiction: 11 Days in May (Waterside Press)
- EBook Reference/Academic: The Visions of Tondal from the Library of Margaret of York Publisher (Getty Publications)
- Enhanced Ebooks: Stretching (Shelter Publications)
- Digital First Ebook: Inside the Script (Warner Bros. Digital Publishing)
- Self Published: iOS App Development for Non-Programmers – Book 1: Diving In (Oak Leaf Enterprises, Inc.)
- Transmedia Project: Dynasty of the Magi (PoetCode)

=== 2014 ===
Winners of the 2014 Digital Book Awards were announced at a gala dinner in New York City on January 13, 2014.

- Ebook Flowable – Adult Fiction: Eversea: A Love Story by Natasha Boyd
- Ebook Flowable — Adult Non-Fiction: Cooking Light Lighten Up, America! by Oxmoor House
- Ebook Flowable – Children: Can You Survive the Titanic?: An Interactive Survival Adventure by Capstone Press
- Ebook Flowable – Reference/Academic: Scotland's Marine Atlas, On Behalf of the Scottish Government by APS Group Scotland
- Ebook Fixed Format/Enhanced – Adult Fiction: Mistress of France by Emma Boling
- Ebook Fixed Format/Enhanced – Adult Non-Fiction: Isa Does It by Little, Brown and Company
- Ebook Fixed Format/Enhanced – Children: The Man with the Violin by Annick Press Ltd.
- Ebook Fixed Format/Enhanced – Reference/Academic: Cracking the GRE: Interactive Prep & Review for the GRE Exam
- Ebook Fixed Format/Enhanced – Illustrated/Comics/Graphic Novels: The World Atlas of Wine iPad Edition by Octopus Publishing Group
- App – Adult Fiction: Steampunk Holmes: Legacy of the Nautilus by Noble Beast
- App – Adult Non-Fiction: The Pocket Scavenger by Penguin Group (USA)
- App – Children: COWZAT! by Colour Me Play
- App – Illustrated/Comics Graphic Novels: Go Big or Go Home: Taking Risks in Life, Love and Tattooing by HarperCollins /Harper Design
- App – Reference/Academic: Disney Animated by Touch Press/Disney
- Digital Cover Design: A Shiver of Sharks by Little Bahalia Publishing
- Transmedia (Any Format): The Niantic Project: Ingress by Niantic Labs at Google
- The Digital Book Award for Inkling Habitat: Modernist Cuisine at Home by The Cooking Lab

=== 2015 ===
The winners were announced January 14, 2015.

- Ebook – Flowable: Adult Fiction: Chinese Whispers by John Ashbery
- Ebook – Flowable: Adult Nonfiction: Women in Clothes by Sheila Heti, Heidi Julavits and Leanne Shapton
- Ebook – Flowable: Children: You Choose: Scooby-Doo!: The Terror of the Bigfoot Beast by Laurie S. Sutton
- Ebook – Flowable: Reference/Academic: Lessons Learned on the Audit Trail by Richard F. Chambers
- Ebook – Fixed Format/Enhanced: Adult Fiction: The Truth Is a Cave in the Black Mountains (Enhanced Multimedia Edition) by Neil Gaiman
- Ebook – Fixed Format/Enhanced: Adult Nonfiction: Penny Chic: How to Be Stylish on a Real Girl's Budget by Shauna Miller
- Ebook – Fixed Format/Enhanced: Children: Virginia Wolf by Kyo Maclear
- Ebook – Fixed Format/Enhanced: Reference/Academic Award Recipient: Study It - English as a Second Language Textbook Series
- App: Adult Fiction Award Recipient: The Hope We Seek by Rich Shapero
- App: Adult Nonfiction Award Recipient: Incredible Numbers by Professor Ian Stewart
- App: Children: Loose Strands by Darned Sock Productions
- App: Reference/Academic: Picasso: The Making of Cubism 1912-1914 by The Museum of Modern Art
- Transmedia: We Are Angry by Lyndee Prickitt
- Education and Learning: Discovery Education Techbook Series by Alycia Chanin
- Ebook Cover Design: Yosemite: A Storied Landscape by Kerry Tremain
