= Letterpress (video game) =

2012 word game

- App icon
- Developer: Loren Brichter
- Publishers: Atebits; Solebon (Note: Solebon published the Mac and Android ports.)
- Designers: Loren Brichter; Jean Whitehead
- Programmer: Loren Brichter
- Artist: Loren Brichter
- Engine: OpenGL
- Platforms: iOS, macOS, Android
- Release: October 24, 2012: iOS; October 24, 2012; macOS; July 20, 2016; Android; August 25, 2017
- Genres: Word game, turn-based strategy
- Modes: Single-player, multiplayer

Letterpress is a 2012 turn-based word video game developed by Loren Brichter and published by Atebits. In it, two players take turns selecting letter tiles to create valid words. Each letter in a word becomes a player's territory on the game board. Whenever surrounding tiles are claimed, the innermost tile becomes locked, and the opponent cannot steal it unless they select nearby unlocked tiles. A round concludes when all 25 tiles are claimed, and whichever player owns the most tiles wins.

Letterpress's development started in November 2011 after Brichter left Twitter, Inc. Theming words with color, he based its game design on Boggle, color wars, and SpellTower. The gameplay gradually evolved during beta testing; in the prototype, players avoided using unclaimed tiles, leading to excessively long games, so to remedy it, Brichter made surrounded tiles unclaimable.

Letterpress was released in October 2012 for iOS. Under Solebon LLC, it was released in July 2016 on the Mac App Store and in August 2017 on Google Play. While Letterpress was praised for its minimalist design and strategic gameplay, it was criticized for its usage of the multiplayer gaming network Game Center. Letterpress was ranked second in the App Store's Best of 2012 list and won the 2013 Apple Design Awards. Apple designer Jony Ive took inspiration from minimalist iOS apps, among them Letterpress, while designing graphics for iOS 7.

== Gameplay ==
Player one (left circle, blue squares) selected tiles to spell the word "positions". The turn switches to player two (right circle, red squares). Locked tiles are indicated with a brighter color.

Player two assembles the word "coarsening". The numbers below the circles show a preview of the score.

All of player two's tiles switch to red, except for player one's locked tile. Player one loses two points, while player two gains nine points.

In Letterpress, two players compete to claim the most tiles on a 5x5 grid of randomized letters. Players must create a valid word to gain territory; they cannot reuse words, use words not listed in a dictionary, or use words from the same word family. When a player finishes their turn, their selected letters change to their color. If a player's tiles surround a letter they have claimed, the opponent cannot claim it, though it can still be used to create words. To indicate this, the surrounded tile becomes a different shade. A locked tile loses its status if an opponent claims tiles in proximity. Players may choose to pass a turn, and once every square is colored, or if both players pass their turns in the same round, the player who owns the most tiles wins. The second player is replaced by a bot in single-player mode.

== Development and release ==
After leaving Twitter, Inc. in November 2011, Loren Brichter, the founder of Atebits 2.0, (Note: Brichter founded the original Atebits company, which was acquired by Twitter, Inc. in 2010.) worked on finishing side projects he previously had little time to work on. With his experience as a graphics engineer for the original iPhone, he had previously created Tweetie and the pull-to-refresh function. Brichter saw Letterpress as a way to experiment with new Apple software. After playing Zach Gage's single-player iOS game SpellTower next to his wife, Jean Whitehead, he was inspired to develop a multiplayer word game they could play together. Focused on combining color and words, Brichter cited Boggle and color wars as influences for gameplay.

Whitehead was the first beta tester and helped refine the rules. In the first version of Letterpress, players could freely create long words, as tiles would only be colored instead of locked. He incorporated a feature that gave players bonus points for claiming tiles that have been surrounded. However, Brichter realized that games would be endless due to players avoiding unclaimed tiles; to fix this, he made surrounded tiles unclaimable. For graphics and the user interface, he took inspiration from the Windows Phone. Letterpress was written in OpenGL, and Game Center, Apple's multiplayer networking service, handled multiplayer matchmaking. Brichter created most of the sound effects himself by spitting and making other noises with his mouth into a microphone. He determined its name based on what the player did, pressing letters, which Brichter felt it alluded to letterpress printing.

Letterpress was released for iOS on October 24, 2012, and on that day, it was downloaded over 60,000 times. By November 2012, it had garnered one million downloads. In December 2012, Letterpress was updated with a replay feature that shows each individual turn in a game. After Solebon LLC acquired Atebits 2.0, it was released on the Mac App Store on July 20, 2016, and on Google Play on August 25, 2017.

Brichter marketed Letterpress as freemium. In the free version, players could only compete in two games at once, while the premium version allowed unlimited games, the ability to see previously played words, and more themes.

== Reception ==
Reception

Aggregate score
Aggregator	Score
Metacritic	89/100

Review scores
Publication	Score
Gamezebo	90/100
Pocket Gamer	4.5/5
TouchArcade	4.5/5
Paste	8.9/10
Slide to Play	Must Have

Letterpress has a "generally favorable" Metacritic rating based on eight critics. It was featured in the App Store's Best of 2012 list, ranking second place as the game of the year for iPhone. It was nominated at the Worldwide Developers Conference and won the 2013 Apple Design Awards.

Reviewers found the strategic elements of Letterpress engaging, comparing it to Scrabble, Reversi, Connect Four, Go, SpellTower, Words With Friends, and chess. Despite Jared Nelson from TouchArcade finding the gameplay challenging to articulate, he noted its addictive nature once players understood the rules. Lex Friedman from Macworld described it as "addictive", while AJ Dellinger of Gamezebo believed it would appeal to "word nerds and strategy-oriented thinkers". Pocket Gamer's Harry Slater commended the suspense inherent in waiting for an opponent's move, labeling Letterpress as "asynchronous gaming at its finest". Matthew Panzarino of The Next Web and Federico Viticci of MacStories both viewed Letterpress as a worthwhile way to pass the time. However, some criticized its lack of a single-player mode.

Certain critics expressed concerns regarding its reliance on Game Center. Luke Larsen of Paste magazine lauded Letterpress as an "incredible achievement", but criticized its dependency on Game Center, which he felt impacted statistics tracking and matchmaking management. Dave Wiskus of iMore attributed Letterpress's absence of in-game chat and a rematch button to Game Center integration. Despite Wiskus noticing the lack of user interaction, he mitigated it with iMessage. He also highlighted problems while starting rematches, stating that simultaneous matches between players would be created. Viticci felt Game Center efficiently handled matchmaking in Letterpress.

Critics unanimously praised Letterpress's design. Ellis Hamburger of The Verge, noting its 6,346 lines of code, described the interface as "barren" with "natural-feeling animations". Nelson called the graphics "aesthetically pleasing", while Dellinger and Shane Richmond of The Daily Telegraph appreciated its clutter-free design. Nelson enjoyed its minimalist style and "smooth animations", drawing parallels to the productivity app Clear. Viticci noted similarities between Letterpress's visuals and Microsoft's Metro design language. Larsen complimented Brichter for its visually appealing menus and "smart aesthetic choices", echoing Wiskus's sentiment that Brichter "put a lot of love and care" into Letterpress. Friedman and Panzarino praised Letterpress's attention to detail, including its sound effects and user interface. Panzarino further praised the polished graphics and "reactive" animations. Ranking it as a "must have", Chris Reed of Slide to Play deemed Letterpress a "gorgeous example of minimalist design". Brandon Sheffield of Game Developer used it as a case study for design, noting its details, interactivity, and simplicity. Letterpress was among a list of minimalist apps provided to inspire Jony Ive, the lead designer for Apple's iOS 7.
