= Agenda =

Agenda (sing.: agendum) may refer to:

== Information management ==
- Agenda (meeting), points to be discussed and acted upon, displayed as a list
- Political agenda, the set of goals of an ideological group
- Agenda (app), note-taking software for macOS and iOS
- Lotus Agenda, a DOS-based personal information manager
- Personal organizer or agenda, a small notebook for organizing personal information

== Music ==
- Agenda (EP), by Pet Shop Boys, 2019
- The Agenda (album), by Cold Blank, 2012

== Organizations ==
- Agenda (charity), a UK-based charity that campaigns for women and girls at risk
- Agenda (think tank), a Norwegian think tank focused on politics and international affairs

== Periodicals and books ==
- Agenda (feminist journal), an African academic journal of feminism
- Agenda (poetry journal), a UK literary periodical
- Agenda (liturgy), a book used in Lutheran worship
- The Agenda, a 1994 book by Bob Woodward

== Places ==
- Agenda, Kansas, a city in the United States
- Agenda, Wisconsin, a town in the United States

== Television ==
- Agenda (Australian TV program), a series of programs since 2010
- Agenda (British TV programme), a 1980s current affairs programme
- Agenda (Irish TV programme), a 1999–2004 current events programme
- Agenda (New Zealand TV programme), a 1999–2009 current events programme
- Agenda (Philippine TV program), a 2024 news programme
- Agenda (Swedish TV program), a 2001 current events programme
- The Agenda, an Ontario, Canada, current affairs program since 2006
- The Agenda with Tom Bradby, a 2012–2016 British chat show
