= Blackbox (video game) =

2016 video game

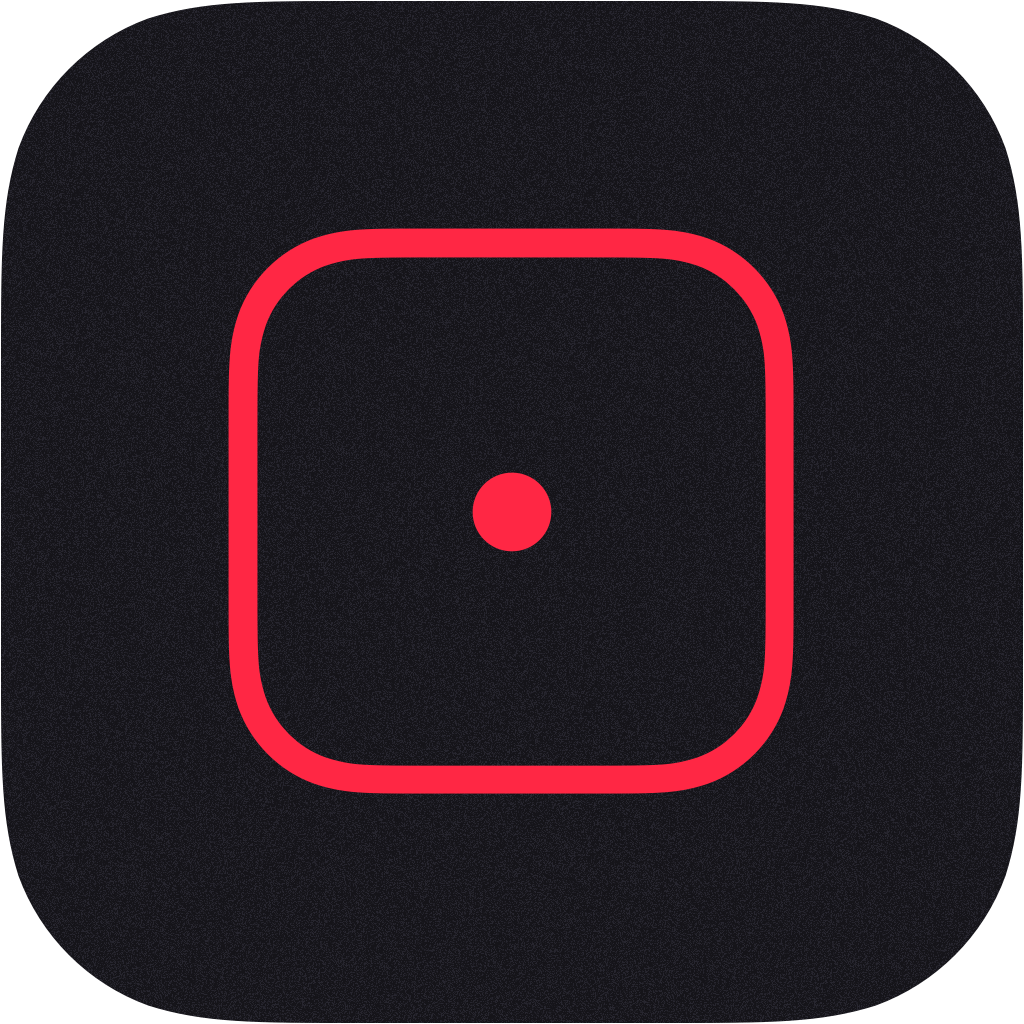
- App icon
- Developer: Ryan McLeod
- Publishers: Shapes & Stories
- Designer: Ryan McLeod
- Composer: Gus Callahan
- Platforms: iOS, Apple Vision Pro
- Release: iOS: February 25, 2016; Vision: February 1, 2024
- Genre: Puzzle
- Mode: Single-player

Blackbox is a 2016 puzzle game developed and designed by Ryan McLeod. In Blackbox, the player solves puzzles by discovering and exploring the device's hardware and operating system; rarely do solutions involve touch mechanics. As the player progresses more puzzles are unlocked. Blackbox won a 2017 Apple Design Award for innovation and excellence in design and accessibility and was recognized as a 2018 Webby Award Honoree in the Puzzle and Best Visual Design categories. It has also won a Golden Apple from AppleVis (an online community of blind and low-vision Apple product users) as “Best iOS Game” for 2017.

== Gameplay ==
In Blackbox, the player attempts to turn on “lights” by solving their associated challenge. Once a challenge is solved, its light is turned on permanently. Lights are displayed on a “home grid” and are grouped in sets by challenge type (each represented by a unique color). Each set of challenges has a unique minimalistic visual and sonic representation that helps player understand and solve its puzzles. The game's grid and non-linear level sequence let players of varying skill and thinking styles to play and explore at their own pace. Each challenge has hints of varying degrees of helpfulness that can be revealed using an in game currency of hint credits which can be bought or earned in different ways.

The game is playable without sight: challenges are represented through audio and haptic feedback in addition to visuals, and the game supports Apple's VoiceOver screen reader as well as Switch Control and Dynamic Type. AppleVis, an online community of blind and low-vision Apple users, named it the best iOS game of 2017.

== Development and release ==
Blackbox was developed over 12 months beginning in late 2014 by Ryan McLeod. Its visual style was inspired by indie games such as Threes, Monument Valley, Letterpress, and Grow. Its puzzles were inspired by indie apps and games Machinarium, Fez, Braid, Portal, Limbo, Hatch, Clear, Peek, and Inception as well as augmented real world games, geocaching, and physical puzzles. After a closed beta test, it was released for iOS on February 25, 2016; the game is under active development with new puzzles and features added regularly.

On February 1, 2024, Blackbox was released for the Apple Vision Pro.

McLeod has continued to develop the game since its release; as of 2026 it includes 81 challenges and has been localized into 31 languages, largely by volunteer translators from its player community. The Apple Vision Pro version, Blackbox for Vision, is a new game rather than a port of the iOS original: it carries over the premise of solving puzzles by discovering and experimenting with the device's capabilities and the player's surroundings, with challenges built around the headset's sensors, gaze, hand gestures, and body movement.

== Reception ==
The game received favorable reviews from critics and players. Reviewers found the game “unlike anything”, “devilishly clever”, and “utterly diabolical” with many noting its novel breadth of mechanics using device sensors and system features. It won a 2017 Apple Design Award, was named a Breakthrough Moment in Gaming, and was downloaded over 4.0 million times as of July 2017. According to McLeod, the game had reached more than 14 million players as of 2026. Blackbox for the Apple Vision Pro won the Apple Design Award for Spatial Computing in 2024.

== See also ==
- OneShot, game that uses similar fourth-wall breaking mechanics
