= Old business =

Old business is a term used in a type of meeting to refer to items that need to be discussed. Old business may refer to;

- Old business, in Robert's Rules of Order
- Old business, in Parliamentary procedure
- Old business, at a Meeting
- Old business, in recorded Minutes

== See also ==
- Agenda (disambiguation)
