= Loren Brichter =

American software developer

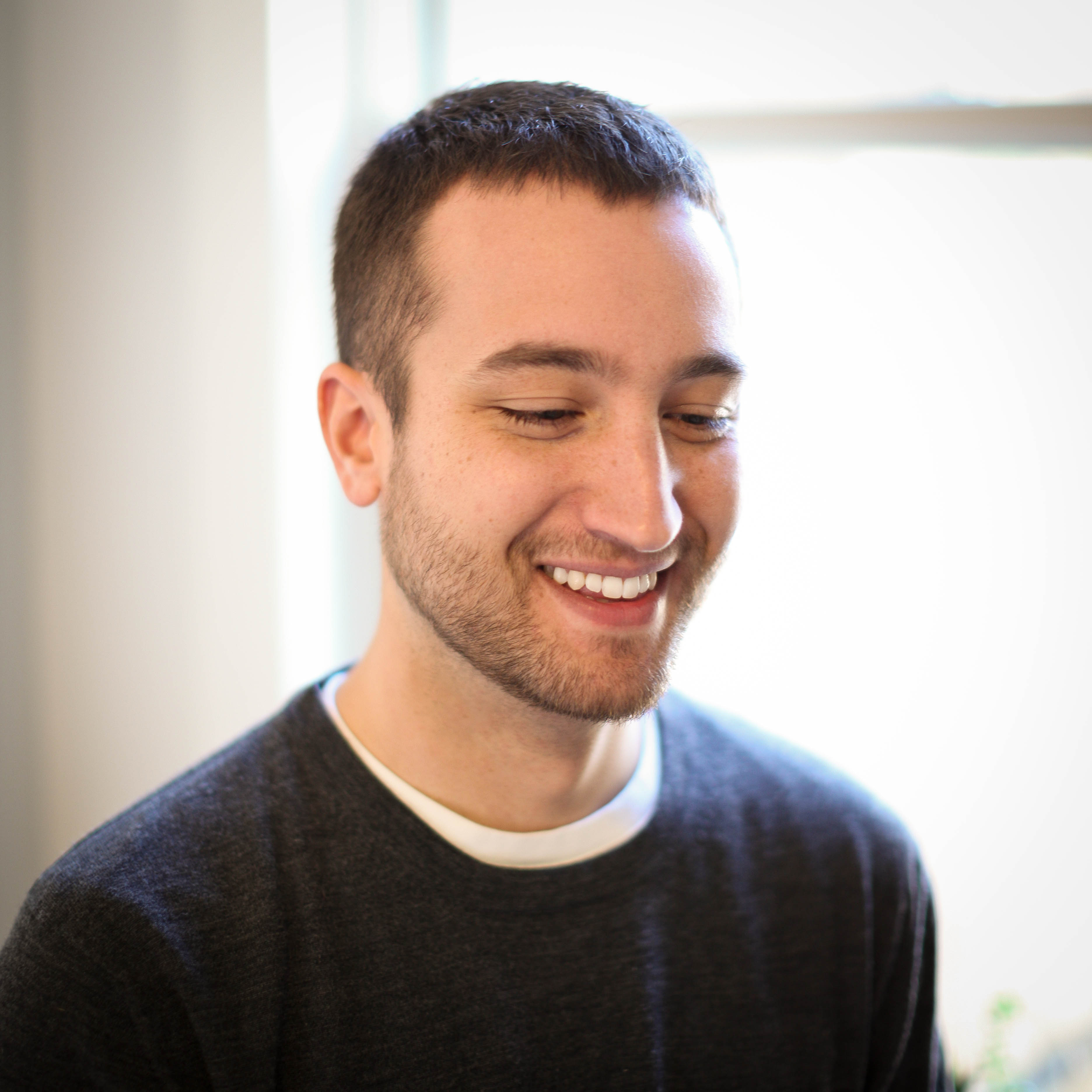
- Brichter in 2012
- Born: November 15, 1984 (age 41); Manhattan, New York
- Education: Tufts University
- Occupation: Software developer
- Known for: Tweetie, pull-to-refresh, Letterpress
- Spouse: Jean Whitehead
- Parents: Gabor Brichter (father); Christina Sidoti (mother)

Loren Brichter (born November 15, 1984) is an American software developer who is best known for creating Tweetie and the pull-to-refresh interaction. After atebits, his self-founded company, was bought by Twitter, Inc. in 2010, he developed a word game for iOS called Letterpress.

== Early life and education ==
Loren Brichter was born in Manhattan, New York, on November 15, 1984. He is a son of contractor Gabor Brichter and real estate entrepreneur, restaurateur, and designer Christina Sidoti. Michael Tempel, his middle school teacher, introduced Brichter to programming with Logo. Brichter was interested in Cocoa during high school and learned C, Objective-C, as well as web programming from his teacher, Chris Lehmann.

Brichter attended Tufts University, intending to study Computer Science. He then switched his major from Computer Engineering to Electrical Engineering and graduated with a degree in Electrical Engineering with a minor in Computer Science. He was offered free masters by the university, which he declined so that he could start his career. Prior to his graduation, he had considered dropping out early due to a job offering from Apple at the beginning of his senior year. However, his family and girlfriend, Jean Whitehead, convinced him to reject it so that he could graduate. Later on, he then got a new offer to work on the then secret iPhone and iPad project, which he accepted and worked on after he graduated.

== Career ==
From 2006 to 2007, Brichter worked at Apple as part of a five-person team responsible for making the iPhone's graphics hardware and software communicate. He left the company after the first iPhone was complete. From 2007 to 2010, Brichter founded his own company, Atebits, in 2007, and released a small drawing app for Mac known as Scribbles. Brichter then released his second app, Tweetie, in 2008, where the pull-to-refresh interaction technique was invented. In the same year, Brichter also co-founded a company Borange. In 2009, he was the recipient of the Apple Designer of Year award. From 2010 to 2011, Brichter worked for Twitter, at which point he would sell Tweetie and his company. Upon leaving Twitter in November 2011, Brichter refounded Atebits, a different company which utilizes the same name as his startup from before. Atebits then released a word game app Letterpress in 2012, which was later sold to Solebon in early 2016. One of the reasons for the app's name was that the whole game operates with letters being pressed by a player's finger. After his time on Twitter, Brichter was asked by Mike Matas, an ex-colleague at Apple, to help with Facebook Paper, an app Facebook was developing, which later released in 2014. Although Paper did not incorporate the pull-to-refresh gesture that Brichter invented, the duo created new gestures and ideas for the project. Brichter's current plans include advising a few companies and spending most of his time working on his own projects.

=== Atebits ===
Atebits was first founded individually by Loren in 2007 after he left Apple, later being sold to Twitter in 2010. In 2012, following Brichter's departure from Twitter, he started a new company with the exact same name as before.

Atebits' first app was Scribbles, released in 2007. It is a basic drawing app for the Mac, inspired by MacPaint. Scribbles uses a hybrid vector rendering engine. As a result, resizing, scaling, zooming, and exporting images at high resolution can all be done with no reduction in quality. The app also allows users to share their illustrations with one another through integration with the Scribbles Gallery. Scribbles was Brichter's first attempt at building a custom UI framework. In 2008, Atebits released Tweetie, a Twitter app for iOS. Tweetie for Mac followed in 2009.

After Brichter re-founded the company, Atebits released Letterpress in 2012. Letterpress is a multiplayer word game that connects players using Apple's social gaming network, Game Center. He started Letterpress once he left Twitter, Inc. in November 2011. When Brichter first created the game, his wife was his first beta tester, and the rules of the game evolved from beta tests. In early 2016, Letterpress was sold to Solebon.

=== Tweetie ===
Tweetie was launched in 2008, and it was created to fill the absence of an in-house Twitter app for the Apple iPhone platform. Later on, in April 2009, Brichter also released Tweetie for Mac. Tweetie for both platforms was acquired by Twitter a year later.

=== Borange ===
In 2008, Brichter founded Borange with Mason Lee and Martin Turon while he was living in Berkeley, California. The company has created two apps, the first being Borange, a social availability app that enables users to keep track of their friends’ activities through a social timeline view on their mobile device. The second app, Textie, is a free messaging app across mobile devices. Both apps under Borange were released before push notifications or iMessage were introduced, creating a need for them in the market.

== Personal life ==
Brichter is married to Jean Whitehead, and together, they have three children.

== Interaction techniques ==
=== Pull-to-refresh ===
Brichter is the creator of the pull-to-refresh gesture that first came out on Tweetie 2.0 for iPhone. The gesture allows a user to pull vertically downwards on a touchscreen before releasing, to allow the page to refresh as opposed to former methods of pressing a refresh button. This gesture has since then been adopted by many apps on mobile devices, such as Mail in iOS.

=== Cell Swipe ===
Cell Swipe was also created by Brichter and released in Tweetie. The gesture involves swiping a cell off the screen to reveal a set of hidden icons and features. An example would be the cells in Tweetbot, where swiping them reveals options to retweet, reply and so on.

=== Sliding panels ===
The idea of sliding panels first emerged in Brichter's creation of Twitter for iPad where the panels would be horizontally stacked and swiped in by gesture. The panels of data that are swiped in created layers of tweets, people, and information that allow a user to browse increasingly more information while keeping their last state and path back. This feature is also currently adopted by other apps such as the mobile Facebook and Spotify apps.

=== Vertical list icons ===
Other than gestures, Brichter has also introduced vertical list icons that first came out in Tweetie for Mac 1.0. This design is a vertical list of icons by a border of the screen that displays the different tabs that users may navigate through in the app. This pattern has since been employed by some Mac apps such as Slack and Tweetbot.
