= Song of Bloom =

2019 video game

- Developer: Kamibox
- Designer: Philipp Stollenmayer
- Platform: iOS, Android
- Release: 28 December 2019
- Mode: Single-player

Song of Bloom is a 2019 video game created by independent developer Kamibox for iOS. Upon release, the game received positive reviews from critics, with several naming it as one of the best iOS titles or mobile puzzle games. Following release, Song of Bloom received several awards and nominations, including nominations for the Seumas McNally Grand Prize and Nuovo Award at the Independent Games Festival and winning the Mobile Game of the Year at the 24th Annual D.I.C.E. Awards.

== Gameplay ==
Described by the developer as a "narrative puzzle game", Song of Bloom is a mobile title where players use touch gestures to solve puzzles across 18 scenes, depicting the thoughts of the protagonist, who is hallucinating. Each scene features a different artistic style.

== Development ==
The game was created by Kamibox, the studio of German independent developer Philipp Stollenmayer. Stollenmayer stated that the game was an "experimental journey", creating the game in Corona. Stollenmayer created the assets for the game using different art styles and techniques, including claymation, knitting, sketching and carving, to "force a visual overkill and suck the player into the mind of the protagonist".

== Reception ==
Reception

Review scores
Publication	Score
148Apps	4/5
Metro UK	8/10

Song of Bloom received positive reviews from critics. Several publications listed Song of Bloom as one of the best mobile, iPhone or puzzle games, with Pocket Gamer stating the game's puzzles involved "eclectic problems that require logical thinking, keen observation, and experimentation", and TheGamer describing it as a "unique and tactile experience" with "beautiful art". Campbell Bird of 148Apps considered the game to be an "an incredibly beautiful and creative puzzle adventure", but stated it felt the game ended without a satisfying resolution and "hints at things in a confusing way". Metro UK praised the game as "beautifully drawn and with a haunting soundtrack", stating "the cyclical nature of the game and its oblique plot exposition make this a playful and constantly delightful experience". Stating that the game was "not for everyone", 4Gamer praised the title as "philosophical" and "mysterious" based on its "fusion of unique and meaningful words". Describing Song of Bloom as an "absolute masterpiece", TouchArcade, highlighting it as the site's Game of the Week, praised the game for its "surprisingly deep narrative elements" and "clever puzzle designs".

=== Accolades ===
At the 2020 Independent Games Festival, Song of Bloom was nominated for the Seumas McNally Grand Prize and for Excellence in Visual Art as an Honorable Mention, and was shortlisted for the Nuovo Award. The game received an Apple Design Award in 2020. At the 24th Annual D.I.C.E. Awards, Song of Bloom also received a nomination for Mobile Game of the Year. It also received the Best Mobile Game at the 2020 Deutscher Computerspielpreis.
