= Kamibox =

Independent video game developing studio

Kamibox studios
- Industry: Video games; Papercraft
- Founder: Phillip Stollenmayer
- Headquarters: Germany
- Website: kamibox.de

Kamibox is an independent German video game developer founded by Philipp Stollenmayer. Stollenmayer is the sole employee of the company, which creates almost exclusively mobile games. Some of Kamibox's games have received awards for their design, including an Apple Design Award. Kamibox games often have a philosophical element to them, such as see/saw and Sometimes You Die, which explore the concept of death in video games.

Stollenmayer also designs papercraft models under the Kamibox branding and had done for some time before he started producing games. Stollenmayer's background in paper modelling often lends a more experimental lean to Kamibox's games.

== Origin ==
Kamibox was originally founded by Philipp Stollenmayer as a papercraft company but developed into a video game designer after Stollenmayer learned to code. The name Kamibox comes from the Japanese word for paper, kami (紙 or かみ).

The studio is run solely by Stollenmayer. Born in 1991, he now lives in Riedstadt, Germany. Before creating games, Stollenmayer took a bachelor's degree in communication design at Mannheim University of Applied Sciences from 2011 and a master's degree in information design in Würzburg. It was during the third semester of his communication design course that he first started coding games using Lua, at the age of 21.

== Games and applications ==
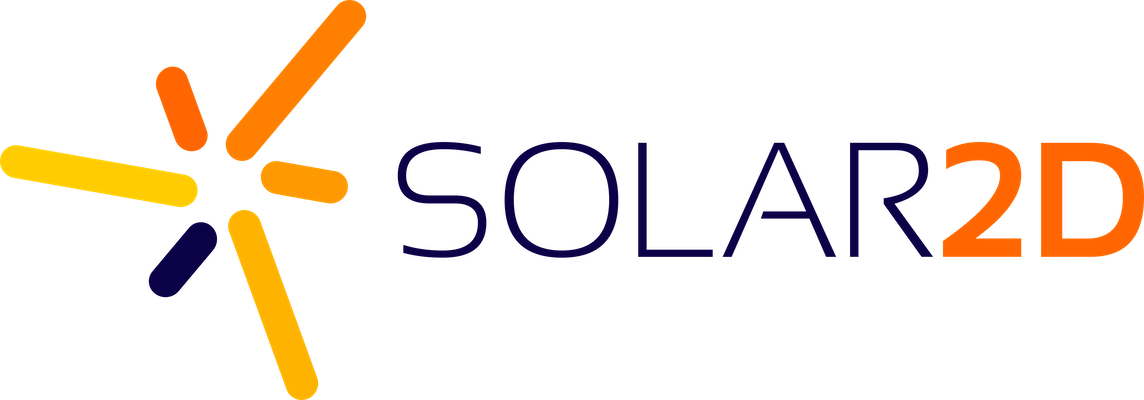
Solar 2D's logo

Stollenmayer codes all the games released by Kamibox in Solar2D (formerly CoronaSDK) although he has experimented with Unity, Xcode and Swift. Kamibox games are two-dimensional and diverse in their genres, with an emphasis on original and eccentric graphic designs inspired by his background in papercraft. As of 2022, Kamibox has produced or contributed to 25 games that are (or have been) available to download:

- Tiny Paper Zoo (2012) - Kamibox's first app. It is essentially an instruction manual to create papercraft animals. The designs are sorted into three difficulty levels; some designs include a seal, a penguin, a zebra, an elephant and a panda. There are options to either print or trace the outline of the design.
- Awesome Paper Toys (2013) - in the vein of Tiny Paper Zoo, the app is a collection of instructions for building papercraft models. There are nine models to make, with three categories of difficulty. Estimated times to build the models range from five minutes to an hour.
- What The Frog (2013) - Kamibox's first game. What the Frog is a physics game where you control the movement of the game's titular character "What", a frog. To do this, the game uses the iPhone's sensors to detect tapping and shaking of the device which it uses to control the movement of the character. What the Frog's design is inspired by a low-resolution television set. The aim of the game is to complete quests which unlocks new characters to play as.
- cyro (2013) - in cyro players control a duo of creatures that carry a plank through a rotating maze. The goal of the game is get the plank through the maze in order to make a bridge to the moon. Touching the walls of the maze causes the loss of a life (of which you have two). cyro has a minimalist design. The game has 48 levels and is partly inspired by Kuru Kuru Kururin.
- Sometimes You Die (2014) - similar to the roguelike genre of games, Sometimes You Die is a platformer puzzle game based around the use of dead bodies to complete puzzles. After dying, the player's body remains on the map and can be used as a platform. The game's visuals was in part inspired by the book Extremely Loud & Incredibly Close. It received favorable reviews on release and was praised for its philosophical approach to game design; it was the most downloaded game on the US and German app stores for a period of time. Stollenmayer stated that the game only took a month to be coded; it was made after he finished his college tuition. The game was originally going to be called Rebirth, but Stollenmayer decided that name sounded too much like a first person shooter.
- Get Hi (2015) - a simple game. The gameplay consists of launching a ball up a series of tilting platforms to see how high it can get. The game is controlled with a single touch; hold and release to tilt all platforms in either direction. Power-ups can be collected along the way to increase your progress. Get Hi's soundtrack consists of dubstep music.
- Pancake - The Game (2015) - a high score game where the core mechanic is flipping a pancake. The controls are simple, with tapping the screen controlling the flipping motion. The score is how many flips you can do in a row, with the highest score being tattooed onto the arm flipping the pancake. The game was released in time for Pancake Day. It was produced in a very short amount of time; Stollenmayer stated that the game was designed in the space of a day. The game was featured by Apple on the App Store.
- Burger - The Game (2015) - a sequel to Pancake - The Game. The game has similar mechanics, including the one-tap flipping controls. The aim of the game is to stack as many burger patties on a bun as is possible. There are 30 types of patties you can unlock, including chicken, lobster and rhinoceros. They are unlocked using points gained from every burger you stack.
- Okay? (2015) - a physics game based on rebounding a ball off of blocks to remove them. Okay? is free but uses a payment model that allows users to pay what they want for the game; statistics show that only 2% of people who download the game pay any amount of money for it. The game has been downloaded over 3 million times, partly thanks to the marketing by Christoph Oberleder. Okay? was made over a period of three months and has over 150 levels. It was also featured by Apple.
- 1 Meter (2016) - a game designed around making the longest string of spaghetti possible. Gameplay is simple, a loop of pasta comes onto the screen: hold the screen to turn right, releasing the screen turns left. If the loops of pasta touch, the attempt is over. New plates (maps) are unlocked after reaching milestones in pasta length. Some plates include Alfredo and parmesan.
- Bonobox (2016) - a combination of game and papercraft, Bonobox is a DIY hologram kit with two parts. There is the app for phones and a cardboard housing to create the hologram. In the app, users are able to take pictures of real life objects, draw on them and add animations to them, then project them as a hologram. Bonobox can also be used to play three games: a two player table tennis game, basketball and archery. The games are controlled much like What the Frog, using the iPhone's gyroscope to detect tapping. The cardboard housing uses a specialized mirror system to remove black section of the image and make the it appear three-dimensional. The Bonobox was the subject of a failed Kickstarter; Kamibox only received €951 of its €7,500 goal.
- Squaredance (2016) - a puzzle game with mechanics similar to 2048. It was inspired by King Rabbit and Threes. In the game, players need to merge blocks of the same color to remove them from the board. Each level, of which there are over 100, has a different layout and shape. Squaredance has a built-in level editor (purchasable for €0.99), a first for Kamibox.
- periperi - Fotomashups (2016) - a gamified photography app created as a side project for Stollenmayer. The app allows users to create collages by taking pictures and layering them on top of each other. It does this by allowing the removal of parts of the image, creating a gap. Photos can then be taken through the gap to layer images. You can share your creations.
- Rätselei-Ei (2016) - a puzzle game based around wordplay and puns. Available exclusively in German, the game's name translates as "Riddle-Egg". In each level players have to complete a phrase that has two words removed. There are over 130 levels in the game.
- Zip Zap (2016) - a physics puzzle game. The game revolves around using Meccano-style beams and joints to reach target areas. Stollenmayer took inspiration from organic muscles for the joints. The game is controlled one finger, toggling on and off th contraction of the hinges. The game uses realistic gravity to model the paths of balls and other objects. There are over 100 levels to play. Zip Zap has been featured by the Apple App Store as their Game of the Week.
- Verticow (2017) - a physics based high score game with graphics inspired by Monty Python. Mechanics involve using momentum to generate spin, which is then released. A player's score is how far you can fling various different items. Verticow uses ads to generate revenue. On 16 March 2018 it was featured by International Mobile Gaming Awards as their game of the day.
- cmplt (2017) - a puzzle game. Inspired by Picross DS (a game Stollenmayer played on the DS), the game is based around completing pixilated pictures. In fact, the game's name is a play on the word complete, simply having its vowels removed. cmplt's design is paperlike, looking distinctly handcrafted. There are 135 levels to complete in the game.
- Letter^{2} (2017) - a word puzzle. Letter tiles are placed in a small grid (other grids are unlockable). Players attempt to create words to clear the grid. The letters that appear are not known to the player beforehand and you cannot move placed letter tiles. There is also a two-player mode.
- supertype (2018) - a physics game based on letters. Unlike being a word game, the game uses the letters distinct shapes to solve puzzles. To do this, type in a word. The letters of the word are then individually acted upon by gravity, falling down a pinball-like grid of obstacles. There are over 130 levels including the Concrete Pack, a later added content pack featuring "27 superhard new levels". Kamibox added a level editor in a later update, levels can be shared using a code. The game's soundtrack is generative.
- Bacon - The Game (2018) - in the vein of Pancake - The Game and Burger - The Game, it is a food based level type game. The game uses the same controls to flip a piece of bacon onto various items, including the Moon, the Eiffel Tower and the actor Kevin Bacon. Bacon - The Game has 322 levels, a free level editor, character customisation and an endless "Bacon Forever" mode, and has been downloaded over 18 million times (on all platforms). Stollenmayer personally sent letters to people who managed to complete the entire game which included a pin-badge and a handwritten card. The pin-badge is still given out to whoever got the highscore on Bacon Forever each day. In a more recent update, there were sticker sheets given out when one finished the sticker collection. The game has advertisements which can be removed by purchasing either ad-free bacon, Supertype, or see/saw.
- see/saw (2018) - a platformer that uses sacrificing the player's character as a gameplay mechanic, like Sometimes You Die. The goal of each level (of which there are 153) is to collect three coins scattered around the map. see/saw is quite difficult, taking cues from genre classics like VVVVVV and Super Meat Boy, as well as having a timed mode for extra challenge. The game only has two controls, to tilt the map (and character) to either side. There is no jump control; it is replaced with jump pads. The act of self-sacrifice lends a philosophical part to see/saw, showing a juxtaposition between the colorful designs of the game and its themes.
- Song of Bloom (2019) - an abstract puzzle game with music by Wojtek Slawinski. Song of Bloom is non-linear and has no overarching goal aside from a loose story. The 18 levels (called "scenes") of Song of Bloom are a medley of different aesthetics. All graphics are coded, Stollenmayer used his own errors in his code as inspiration for designs. The game is inspired by many sources, including games such as Blackbox, Device 6 and Prune as well as artists Laure Prouvost and Franz West. Like Blackbox the game uses the entirety of the iPhone, including volume buttons and charging cables, as a controller. The idea for Song of Bloom came from a holiday that Stollenmayer took to Italy. After taking a video of the sea he began experimenting on using rotation as a control, which lead to the more innovative control methods of the game. Song of Bloom was the game that earned Kamibox an Apple Design Award in 2020.
- Sticky Terms (2020) - another word game. Sticky Terms is based around untranslatable terms, words that lose meaning when translated. These words are split up into two to five parts; the game asks players to reassemble them by moving and pivoting the fragments. After finishing the puzzle, the meaning of the word is provided. The 249 words in the game are split up into different categories. The game is free but has advertisements. They can be removed by purchasing either Supertype or see/saw.
- Kitty Q (2021) - an educational escape game featuring on Schrödinger's cat. Produced in association with the Würzburg-Dresden Cluster of Excellence ct.qmat, the game aims to teach children about quantum physics. There are over 20 puzzles to solve. It was funded by the German Federal Ministry of Education and Research, who gave the project €100,000.
- A Joke That's Worth $0.99 (2022) - a game designed for the Playdate, the game is based on using the console's crank to keep a character airborne to reveal lines of a joke. To be played, it must be sideloaded onto the Playdate as it is 3rd party software. The game's name is two-fold: the telling of a joke is the concept of the game; the price is a reference to the fact that the game is permanently on special offer for $0.99 (from $1) due to Itch.io not allowing $0.99 as a regular price.

== Papercraft models ==
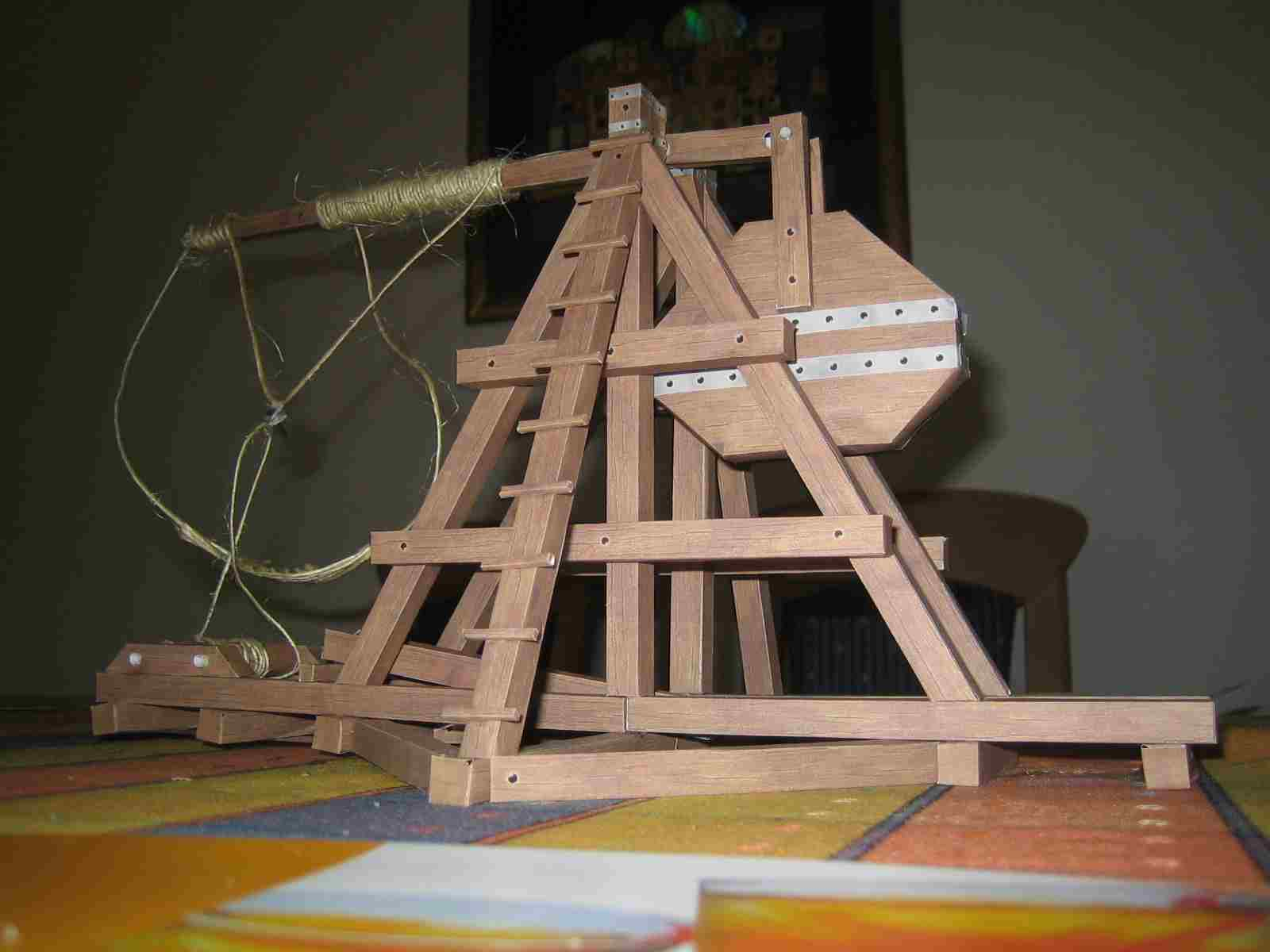
A papercraft trebuchet made by Stollenmayer (designed by Sheila Mertens)

Stollenmayer has designed papercraft models under the Kamibox name since at least 2007. His first model was a Nintendo Wii; it was drawn by hand rather than using 3D modelling software (as all his future models were). The papercraft models are released on both the Kamibox website and Instructables for free. On Instructables, Stollenmayer has won or placed highly in papercraft competitions, including the grand prize of the 2013 Craft Contest.

== Awards and nominations ==
- Grand Prize 2013 Instructables Craft Contest.
- 2013 German multimedia award (mb21) for What the Frog.
- Sometimes You Die nominated for the 11th International Mobile Gaming Awards ceremony (Excellence in Innovation).
- 2015 App Art Award from the ZKM for Sometimes You Die.
- Zip Zap nominated for the 13th International Mobile Gaming Awards ceremony.
- Verticow nominated for the 14th International Mobile Gaming Awards ceremony.
- see/saw nominated for the 15th International Mobile Gaming Awards ceremony.
- Song of Bloom nominated for 2020 Independent Games Festival Grand Prize, Nuovo and Excellence in Visual Art awards.
- 2020 Apple Design Award for Song of Bloom.
- PLAY20 Most Creative Game.
- 2020 ITFS Animated Games Award.
- 2020 Ludicious award runner-up.
- Song of Bloom awarded Best Mobile Game 2020 at the Deutscher Computerspielpreis.
- Sticky Terms finalist in 2021 Google Play Indie Games Festival.
- Song of Bloom nominated for the 2021 D.I.C.E awards (Best Mobile Game of the Year).
