= MacJournal =

Blogging software

- Developer(s): Dan Schimpf
- Stable release: 7.3.1 / 2022-06-06
- Operating system: Classic Mac OS, macOS
- Type: Journal software & Blogging tool
- License: Freeware
- Website: danschimpf.com

MacJournal is journaling and blogging software originally developed for Mac OS X. It is published by Dan Schimpf Software. MacJournal offers only basic text formatting and limited page layout features. MacJournal's audience includes diarists, bloggers and podcasters.

MacJournal supports online blog tools including: LiveJournal, Blogger, Movable Type and WordPress. It also contains powerful searching capabilities, allows keeping multiple nested journals. Includes password protection, AES-256 encryption and Palm (PDA) syncing.

MacJournal was written by Dan Schimpf and was awarded Best Mac OS X Student Product at the 2002 Apple Design Awards. It was initially distributed as Freeware, then made Shareware. In 2004 the project was purchased by Mariner Software, and Schimpf was hired to continue development.

In 2012, MacJournal was given an Editors' Choice Award by Macworld.

In early 2019, development and distribution of MacJournal was reverted from Mariner Software back to its original developer, Dan Schimpf. In March 2019, Dan Schimpf Software released version 7.0.0 of MacJournal as freeware. As of late 2022, Schimpf is continuing active development of MacJournal, releasing updates.
