= FotoMagico =

Slideshow software

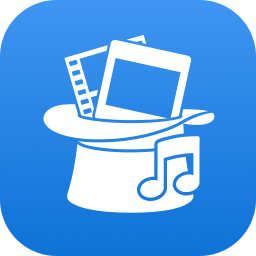
- Original author(s): Peter Baumgartner
- Developer(s): Boinx Software
- Initial release: March 2007
- Stable release: 6 / November 29, 2021; 3 years ago
- Operating system: macOS 10.15.2 and later
- Available in: 3 languages
- List of languages English, French, German
- License: Trialware,
- Website: fotomagico.com

FotoMagico is a slideshow editor for Apple Macintosh and Apple iPad, developed by Boinx Software International GmbH. The software has been rewarded with several Apple Design Awards. Boinx Software has released FotoMagico 6, the latest version of their top-drawer slideshow authoring software. The bundle includes applications for both the Mac and the iPad, plus tons of extras including templates and royalty-free music tracks.

== Reception ==
The 2020 iPad version of the product was positively reviewed by J.R. Bookwalter writing in Macworld, who described it as "a dazzling new edition of an already fantastic, affordable slideshow solution for all Mac users, but the Pro version offers the most bang for the buck". Bookwalter also review the 5th edition of FotoMagico positively in 2016.

A 2012 review of the fourth edition of FotoMagico in The Mac Observer praised the import and export options, the performance of the application in terms of speed, and the seamless operation of the Storyboard and Timeline functionalities. The same review also criticised the cost of the application, the inability of the user to change its layout, and way that voice narration is not easy to access within the application.

== Awards ==
- 2006: Apple Design Award (Runner up; Best Mac OS X User Experience)
- 2007: Best Creative Application (MacGeneration Trophées)
- 2008: Apple Design Award (Best Mac OS X Leopard Graphics and Media Application Runner-Up)

== See also ==
- Slideshow
- Presentation software
- Non-linear editing system
- Comparison of image viewers
