= Bobo Explores Light =

2011 educational book app for the iPad

- Developer: Game Collage
- Release: September 12, 2011
- Platform: iPad
- Type: Education Book
- Website: gamecollage.com

Bobo Explores Light is an education book app for iPad that introduces children to light and light related topics. It was released in September 2011. Bobo was developed by Game Collage in collaboration with journalist Bob Tedeschi, creator and author of The New York Times weekly App Smart column. In 2012, Bobo Explores Light won an Apple Design Award. The app was discontinued in the face of IOS platform changes that would have required a complete coding revision.

== Features ==
The main character is a friendly, humorous robot named Bobo who helps kids learn about the science of light. He serves as guide throughout the 21 chapters exploring light-related subjects such as lighting, bioluminescence, lasers, refraction and the human eye. Targeted for school-aged children, the app presents interactive elements, supplementary videos, articles, animations and trivia.

== Development and release ==
A screenshot explaining photosynthesis. Bobo, the main character, explains the principles of photosynthesis using an interactive animation.

In 2010 Tedeschi came up with the idea to write about the process of developing and publishing an app. He teamed up with app developer Juraj Hlavac and illustrator Dean MacAdam and together they developed Bobo Explores Light over a six-month period. Tedeschi has credited Hlavac with executing the most difficult task of the development process—-namely, coding the entire app in accordance with the trio's highly-ambitious vision. When the app launched, in order to avoid preferential treatment from Apple and other journalists, Tedeschi used the pseudonym Craig Fusco.

The app was released in September 12, 2011 for iPad, under the books category.

== Recognition ==
Upon launch it was noted by Apple as iPad App of the Week, receiving positive press. It reached first place in the US top iPad book sales in the same month. In June 2012, Apple presented the 2012 Apple Design Awards at the WWDC, selecting Bobo Explores Light as one of the iPad winners.
