= Sparrow (email client) =

Email client

- User interface, depicting the quick reply feature
- Original authors: Dominique Leca; Đinh Việt Hòa; Jean-Marc Denis; Jean-Baptiste Bégué; Louis Romero
- Developer: Sparrow SARL
- Release: February 9, 2011; 15 years ago
- Final release: 1.6.4 / October 5, 2012; 14 years ago
- Written in: Objective-C
- Operating system: OS X; iOS
- Size: 12.6 MB
- Available in: English
- Type: Email client
- License: Proprietary commercial software
- Website: www.google.com/intl/en/mail/help/sparrow.html

Sparrow is a discontinued email client for OS X and iOS. After a 4-month beta period, Sparrow went on sale in the Mac App Store on February 9, 2011 and became the top paid and top grossing app in less than one day. On July 20, 2012, the company announced that it had been acquired by Google and was ceasing continued development of the application except for critical bug fixes.

== Versions ==
=== Desktop ===
Sparrow used a simplified user interface reminiscent of Twitter clients such as Tweetie, as opposed to a more traditional email style such as Apple's Mail or Mozilla Thunderbird. Sparrow worked with Gmail and Google Apps accounts, along with other IMAP email accounts. It also included features such as drag-and-drop attachments, Dropbox or Box.net support for uploading attachments, Growl support, Gmail labels and keyboard shortcuts, as well as quick replies, threaded replies and easy switching between accounts.

=== iPhone version ===
In March 2012, Sparrow for iOS was released in the App Store.

== Acquisition by Google ==
On July 20, 2012, Sparrow and Google jointly announced that Sparrow had been purchased by Google and the company's employees would be added to their Gmail team. Due to this, they also announced that development of both of Sparrow's apps would be ended except for critical bug fixes.

The purchase and subsequent discontinuation prompted criticism from some tech sites, who were uncertain about the future of the apps. Sean Gallagher of Ars Technica wrote he was concerned for the app's future given Google's previous history of buying out and subsequently abandoning development on other startups such as reMail, Meebo and Quickoffice. Rafe Needleman of CNET wrote that the purchase combined with the ceasing development of Mozilla Thunderbird meant there was a growing lack of quality desktop mail clients. Rob Beschizza of Boing Boing created a satirical video instructing users to prepare for the acquisition by deleting the app from their computer.

However, TIME noted that the acquisition may lead to better apps for Gmail. Adrian Covert of Gizmodo expressed excitement about a possible official desktop client for Gmail.

== Related development ==
In 2014, Google released Inbox by Gmail, an email app with functionality similar to Sparrow. Inbox was shut down by Google on April 2, 2019.
