= Banktivity =

Personal finance management suite

- Developer: IGG Software Inc.
- Release: 2003; 23 years ago
- Operating system: macOS, OS X, iOS
- Type: Personal finance, Accounting software
- License: Proprietary
- Website: banktivity.com

Banktivity (formerly known as iBank) is a personal finance management suite designed for macOS and iOS platforms by IGG Software, first released in 2003 as Mac desktop software.

== History ==
There have been several releases for the desktop version since its inception. IGG Software Inc. also released iOS versions for the iPhone (2009), the iPad (2012), and Apple Watch. Features differ between the apps; specifically the iPhone version does not support reporting. As of June 2026, version 10 is current.

Macworld compared iBank 2 to Quicken, but "with a decidedly Mac-like interface". iBank 3 was updated for Mac OS X Leopard, with support for Cover Flow, Quick Look, and Core Animation. It also integrates with other Apple Inc. products, such as syncing with an iPhone via MobileMe. iBank 3.4 improved support for Quicken import.

iBank 4 was updated to be compatible with Mac OS X 10.7. Some iBank 4 features included Direct Connect (downloads from online accounts), iPhone sync, MobileMe compatibility, interactive charts, multiple currencies, a budget monitor, check printing, loan and portfolio management, smart accounts, TurboTax exporting, and Quicken importing.

iBank 5 was released on November 19, 2013, adding online billpay, Direct Access and improvements to budgeting. iBank 5 saw the release of six major upgrades to the product through iBank 5.6.4 which included the addition of iBank Cloud Sync. IGG changed the name of its personal finance software line from iBank to Banktivity in 2016; Banktivity 5 was released on January 28, 2016.

Banktivity 6: initial public release on April 25, 2017.

Banktivity 7: initial public release on September 24, 2018.

Banktivity 10: initial public release on May 26, 2026.

Banktivity includes a proprietary cloud sync that can be used between macOS and iOS devices, traditional and envelope budgets, multi-currency support and investment portfolio management.

== Reception ==
According to MacWorld, MacLife Magazine, Engadget and others, Banktivity is considered in the Mac user community as viable alternative to Quicken for Mac.

iBank was the runner-up for the Best Mac OS X Leopard Application in the 2007 Apple Design Awards.
