= ReadCube =

Reference manager software company

- Developer: ReadCube
- Initial release: October 2011; 14 years ago
- Operating system: Web-based, Mac; Windows, iOS, Android
- Type: Reference management software
- License: Trialware
- Website: readcube.com

ReadCube is a technology company that develops reference management and digital rights management software. It is currently available as a web-based platform, on mobile operating systems iOS and Android, and as a desktop application. The legacy ReadCube and Papers applications are no longer being actively developed.

The original ReadCube desktop application was available for free, selling premium services such as storage in the online library. In contrast, Papers was a software sold for a one-time payment. ReadCube Papers is now a yearly subscription-based model.

== History ==
ReadCube was created by Labtiva, a Boston-based company. A desktop version was publicly launched in October 2011 with investment from Digital Science, a division of Macmillan Publishers. Shortly after, ReadCube Web Reader was integrated with the website of Nature in November 2011.

A pilot program for ReadCube Access was launched at the University of Utah in September 2012, followed by a public release in Nature Publishing Group journals in November 2012. That same month, version 2.0 of Web Reader launched with several significant changes. In February 2013, ReadCube launched across more than 117 journals published by Wiley.

In April 2014, Labtiva released ReadCube Pro: A product similar to Web Reader with a focus on integration with ReadCubes proprietary cloud offerings.

On 2 December 2014, Nature announced that it would allow its subscribers and a group of selected media outlets to distribute links that provided limited "free" access to journal articles through ReadCube Web Reader. While it does provide some free articles, it is not a completely open access scheme due to restrictions on the users' ability to download, copy, print, or distribute the content using digital rights management.

On March 16, 2016, ReadCube acquired Papers from Springer Nature for an undisclosed amount. In September 2023, ReadCube Pro officially rebranded as Papers. An on-site announcement stated:

"ReadCube will be the brand dedicated to our enterprise clients, and Papers will be focused solely on students, independent researchers, and academia."

== Products ==
ReadCube Enhanced PDF for articles published by Nature Publishing Group, Frontiers and John Wiley & Sons and any articles uploaded into the ReadCube Papers cloud.

ReadCube Checkout is a service that offers rental, cloud, and downloadable article access options outside journal subscriptions. This checkout functionality is offered for the majority of journal articles on several publisher pages.

Literature Review is a software designed to help teams monitor and analyze published literature.

== See also ==
- Comparison of reference management software
- Nature Publishing Group
- Metadata discovery
