= Laurie S. Sutton =

American writer

- Born: March 19, 1953 (age 73) Woodbury, New Jersey, U.S.
- Areas: Writer, Editor
- Notable works: "Adam Strange"; Scooby-Doo!: The Terror of the Bigfoot Beast
- Awards: Publishing Innovation Award 2015

Laurie S. Sutton (born March 19, 1953) is an American writer of comic books and children's books. She worked for DC Comics and Marvel Comics in the 1980s and has written several books for Capstone Publishers in the 2010s.

== Career ==
Laurie S. Sutton was born in Woodbury, New Jersey. Her father was a project manager for Mobil and the family frequently moved across the country. She began reading comic books at the age of 8 after receiving a large number of them as a Christmas gift. After graduating from Sarah Lawrence College in 1975, Sutton worked for Abaris Books and the Comics Code Authority. Sutton has stated that "when I was a reviewer at the Comics Code from 1978 to 1979, I never considered my job to be one of censorship...As a matter of fact, being a comic book fan, I was very open-minded and lenient with artists, writers and editors who brushed up against the letter of the regulations." She began writing for DC Comics in 1980 and worked on the "Adam Strange" backup feature in Green Lantern as well as stories for Secrets of Haunted House, Star Trek, and The Unexpected. Frank Miller credits Sutton with introducing him to Japanese comics which influenced his work on Ronin. She worked as an editor for DC (1981–1982) and oversaw "The Great Darkness Saga" storyline in the Legion of Super-Heroes. After leaving DC, Sutton worked for Marvel Comics' Epic Comics line (1983–1985) and for Donning Publishing from 1985 to 1987. She returned to comics in the mid-1990s and wrote Star Trek: Voyager stories for Marvel.

Sutton has written several children's books for Capstone Publishers featuring various DC Comics characters. She credits DC executive Paul Levitz for helping her get this job. She won the Publishing Innovation Award in the category "Ebook – Flowable: Children" for her book Scooby-Doo!: The Terror of the Bigfoot Beast in 2015.

== Bibliography ==
=== Comic books ===
==== DC Comics ====
- Green Lantern #133–147 (Adam Strange backup stories) (1980–1981)
- Secrets of Haunted House #24 (1980)
- Star Trek #20 (1985)
- The Unexpected #210 (1981)

==== Malibu Comics ====
- Star Trek: Deep Space Nine #17–18, Annual #1 (1994–1995)

==== Marvel Comics ====
- Epic Illustrated #22, 24, 28 (1984–1985)
- Star Trek: Voyager #1–3, 10–15 (1996–1998)
- Star Trek: Voyager Splashdown #1–4 (1998)
- Witch Hunter #1 (1996)

==== Warren Publications ====
- Creepy #106 (1979)
- Vampirella #85 (1980)

=== Children's books ===
==== Capstone Publishers ====
- Batman & Robin Adventures: Clayface's Slime Spree 88 pages, March 2016, ISBN 978-1496525406
- Batman Classic: Going Ape 32 pages, April 2012, ISBN 978-0061885228
- Batman: The Joker's Dozen 112 pages, February 2015, ISBN 978-1434297112
- The Dark Knight: Batman vs. the Penguin 88 pages, August 2013, ISBN 978-1434248251
- Far Out Fairy Tales: Goldilocks and the Three Vampires 40 pages, August 2016, ISBN 978-1496537850
- Scooby-Doo: The Curse of Atlantis 112 pages, August 2015, ISBN 978-1496504791
- Scooby-Doo: The Fright at Zombie Farm 112 pages, February 2015, ISBN 978-1434297150
- Scooby-Doo: The Ghost of the Bermuda Triangle 112 pages, August 2014, ISBN 978-1434291295
- Scooby-Doo: The House on Spooky Street 112 pages, August 2015, ISBN 978-1434297167
- Scooby-Doo: The Mystery of the Aztec Tomb 112 pages, August 2014, ISBN 978-1434291288
- Scooby-Doo: The Secret of the Flying Saucer 112 pages, August 2015, ISBN 978-1496504807
- Scooby-Doo: The Secret of the Sea Creature 112 pages, February 2014, ISBN 978-1434279255
- Scooby-Doo: The Terror of the Bigfoot Beast 112 pages, February 2014, ISBN 978-1434279262
- Superman: The Planet Collector 88 pages, August 2014, ISBN 978-1434291370
- Superman: The Real Man of Steel 88 pages, August 2014, ISBN 978-1434291387
- Wonder Woman: Sword of the Dragon 56 pages, February 2014, ISBN 978-1434227607

Preceded by Ross Andru	The Warlord editor 1981–1982	Succeeded by Ross Andru
Preceded by Dick Giordano	Arak, Son of Thunder editor 1982	Succeeded by Dick Giordano
Preceded by Mike W. Barr	Legion of Super-Heroes vol. 2 editor 1982	Succeeded by Karen Berger
Preceded by n/a	Epic Illustrated associate editor 1983–1985	Succeeded by Margaret Clark
Preceded by n/a	Alien Legion associate editor 1984–1985	Succeeded by Carl Potts
