= Airmail (email client) =

Mac and iOS email client

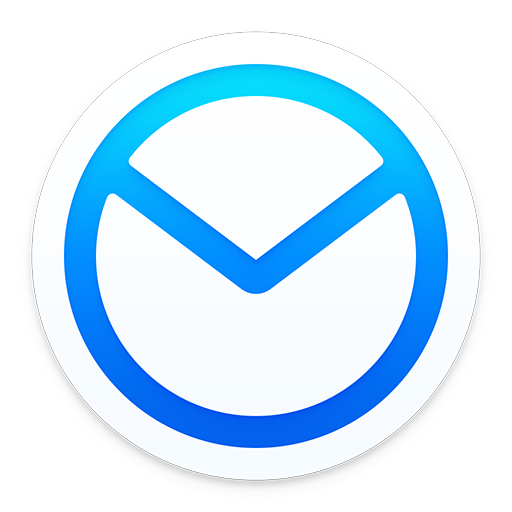
- Developer(s): Bloop SRL
Stable release
- iOS: 4.0.7 / August 18, 2020; 4 years ago
- macOS: 4.1.6 / August 6, 2020; 4 years ago
- Written in: Objective-C, C++
- Operating system: macOS, iOS, watchOS
- Available in: English, Arabic, Burmese, Catalan, Czech, Danish, Dutch, Finnish, French, Galician, German, Greek, Hebrew, Hungarian, Italian, Japanese, Korean, Norwegian Bokmål, Norwegian Nynorsk, Polish, Portuguese, Romanian, Russian, Serbian, Simplified Chinese, Slovak, Spanish, Swedish, Traditional Chinese, Turkish, Ukrainian
- Type: Email client
- License: Proprietary
- Website: airmailapp.com

Airmail is an email client for iPhone and macOS by Italian company Bloop SRL. It was based originally on the Sparrow client.

Macworld reviewed the application in 2013 and concluded that "Airmail is a great-looking email client, and does a few things quite well, but it has a few annoying quirks".

In July 2019, the company changed its licensing model, some features becoming available only to paid users of the application.

== Awards ==
In 2017, Airmail 3 was a winner in the annual Apple Design Awards.
