= Agenda (app) =

Note-taking software for macOS and iOS

- Developer: Momenta B.V.
- Release: 22 January 2018; 8 years ago
- Stable release: 23.4.4 / 4 November 2026; 13 days ago
- Operating system: macOS, iOS, iPadOS
- Platform: Mac, iPhone, iPad
- Type: Note-taking software
- License: Proprietary (freemium)
- Website: agenda.com

Agenda is a note-taking app with calendar awareness for Apple platforms macOS, iOS and iPadOS. Notes can be linked to calendar events, and are ordered chronologically in a project timeline. Launched in January 2018 for the Mac, and in May 2018 on iOS, Agenda is developed by Momenta B.V. in the Netherlands. It won an Apple Design Award at WWDC in its launch year.

== History ==
Momenta B.V. was founded in 2016 by Alexander Griekspoor and Drew McCormack to develop the product. Each had a scientific career before starting the project. Griekspoor developed the reference manager Papers, also for Apple platforms, which was acquired by the publisher Springer. According to McCormack, the idea for a date-centric note-taking app came from the system used by Griekspoor to take meeting notes.

In addition to the Apple Design Award from Apple's Worldwide Developers Conference, Agenda was MacStories' best new app of 2018, and iCulture's best Dutch or Belgian app of 2018.

Later editions added features like linking to Apple's Reminders app; drawing and handwriting with Apple Pencil; collaborative editing; and a redesign to support Liquid Glass and Apple Intelligence.

== Features ==
In Agenda, notes are grouped in projects, and projects into categories. Within each project, notes form a chronological timeline such that scrolling down moves back through the notes in time.

Agenda is integrated with Apple's Calendar app: users can see calendar events and link notes to them, navigating between the two apps directly. Currently relevant notes can be flagged as "On the Agenda", grouping them in an overview for quick access.

Agenda notes are synced via iCloud. The app is free to use, but includes premium features that must be unlocked via an in-app purchase.
