= Star Walk =

Astronomy application

- Logo of the Star Walk application
- Developers: Vito Technology, Inc.
- Initial release: for iPhone/iPod Touch: 2008 for iPad: 2011 for Android: 2014
- Platform: iOS, Android, Windows
- Type: Edutainment
- Website: https://starwalk.space/

Star Walk is an educational astronomy smartphone app developed by Vito Technology which allows users to explore celestial objects in real-time. The application was released in 2009 and is compatible with iOS, Android, and Windows devices. Star Walk has been downloaded by over 10 million users worldwide ever since its release.

It aims to help people locate and identify over 200,000 stars, planets, constellations, and satellites in the night sky and provide detailed information about these objects.

== Functionality ==
The Time Machine function allows users to explore the night sky at different dates and times.

The application aims to determine the position of celestial objects in the sky, calculated in real-time based on the position of the user. It includes information on star clusters, meteor showers, iridium flares, galaxies, and nebulae as well as the current position of dwarf planets, comets, asteroids, and man-made satellites.

Star Walk can also display the times of sunrise and sunset for the Sun (and other visible planets) at a particular location, as well as the current moon phase, elevation angle, and day length.

The app can show the map of the night sky in the past and future. In the iOS version, the app uses the camera for the augmented reality feature, combining the image data from the camera with the star map to give the user a real-time view of celestial objects.

== Star Walk 2 ==
Star Walk 2 is an update of the original Star Walk astronomy application. It has a re-designed interface with 3 camera modes: free roam, manual/scrolling, and augmented reality. The augmented reality view also remains as a holdover from the original app. In order to explore the night sky objects, the user can orient the device toward the sky so that the application activates the camera and the charted objects can be seen appearing superimposed on live sky objects through the use of augmented reality.

Users can scroll a list of objects visible on any night and from any location on Earth.

== Reception ==
In addition to its commercial success, Star Walk has been well-received by critics. At WWDC 2010, Star Walk won an Apple Design Award for the iPad version. In 2012, it won the Parents’ Choice Gold Award in the "Mobile Apps" category, the Academics' Choice Award, and the World Summit Award in the "Entertainment and Lifestyle" category.
