= Pinball HD =

2010 video game

- Developer: Gameprom
- Publisher: Gameprom
- Platforms: iOS, Mac OS X, Android
- Mode: Single-player

Pinball HD is a pinball video game developed and published by Russian-Ukrainian studio Gameprom for the iPad. The game consists of three previously released pinball games; Jungle Style, The Deep and Wild West. Each table can be viewed in the iPad's portrait or landscape modes. The entire table is shown in landscape mode, whereas portrait mode pans and zooms across the table, following the ball. Tapping either side of the iPad's screen activates the corresponding flippers.

== For Mac OS ==
A version of the game was also produced for Mac OS, and is available on the Mac App Store. The game is very similar to the iPad version in that it also has three different pinball games and similar controls.

== Android ==
A version of the game was also produced for Android and is available on the Google Play Store.
