= Air Mail (video game) =

2012 video game

- Developer: Chillingo
- Platform: iOS
- Release: May 24, 2012
- Mode: Single-player

Air Mail is an iOS game developed by British studio Chillingo Ltd and released on May 24, 2012.

== Critical reception ==
The game has a Metacritic score of 85% based on 11 critic reviews.

SlideToPlay wrote "Air Mail is a delightful flight sim with broad appeal. It's about the precise controls and engaging story, not locking on with missiles or machine guns. " Vandal Online said " An original, fun and entertaining app that is above most of the games in the App Store. Its gameplay is direct and its control great, and is also beautifully crafted in graphics." AppSmile said "A high-flying and highly-enjoyable experience, Air Mail allows you to take to the skies like few others." Gamezebo wrote "Despite its lack of realism, fans of flight will want to sample it-as will anyone else who's just in the mood for a whimsical iOS game." 148Apps said "Air Mail definitely lives up to the promise that the game had when I first got to play it. This is a fun flying game that has the feel of a Nintendo 64 or Dreamcast classic with its colorful graphics and feel, and it's well worth the premium app price to check it out."

TouchGen wrote "This is one of my favorite high-flying games on iOS. It looks fantastic, provides solid options for controls and has a cool story that makes each and every task feel important. I would love to have seen some multiplayer and improved cutscenes. That being said, this is a damn good game that I absolutely loved, and highly recommend." TouchArcade wrote "The advanced control requires a good bit of practice to get it right, but should eventually be your control of choice." Edge Magazine said "And though a clutch of score-based challenges are both too few and too brisk, they contribute to an iOS game of rare generosity and substance." AppSpy wrote "Air Mail brings a much-needed sense of fun and freedom to the App Store, encouraging players to breathe in its wonderful world through exploration. " Modojo wrote "Air Mail could've been exceptional, but as it stands, the game will just have to settle for being great, with beautiful art work, tight controls and fun exploration/time-based play." Pocket Gamer UK said "An impressive game with a gorgeous world you'll want to explore, Air Mail is only let down by its lack of challenge. "
