= Papers (software) =

Reference management software

Papers (ReadCube)

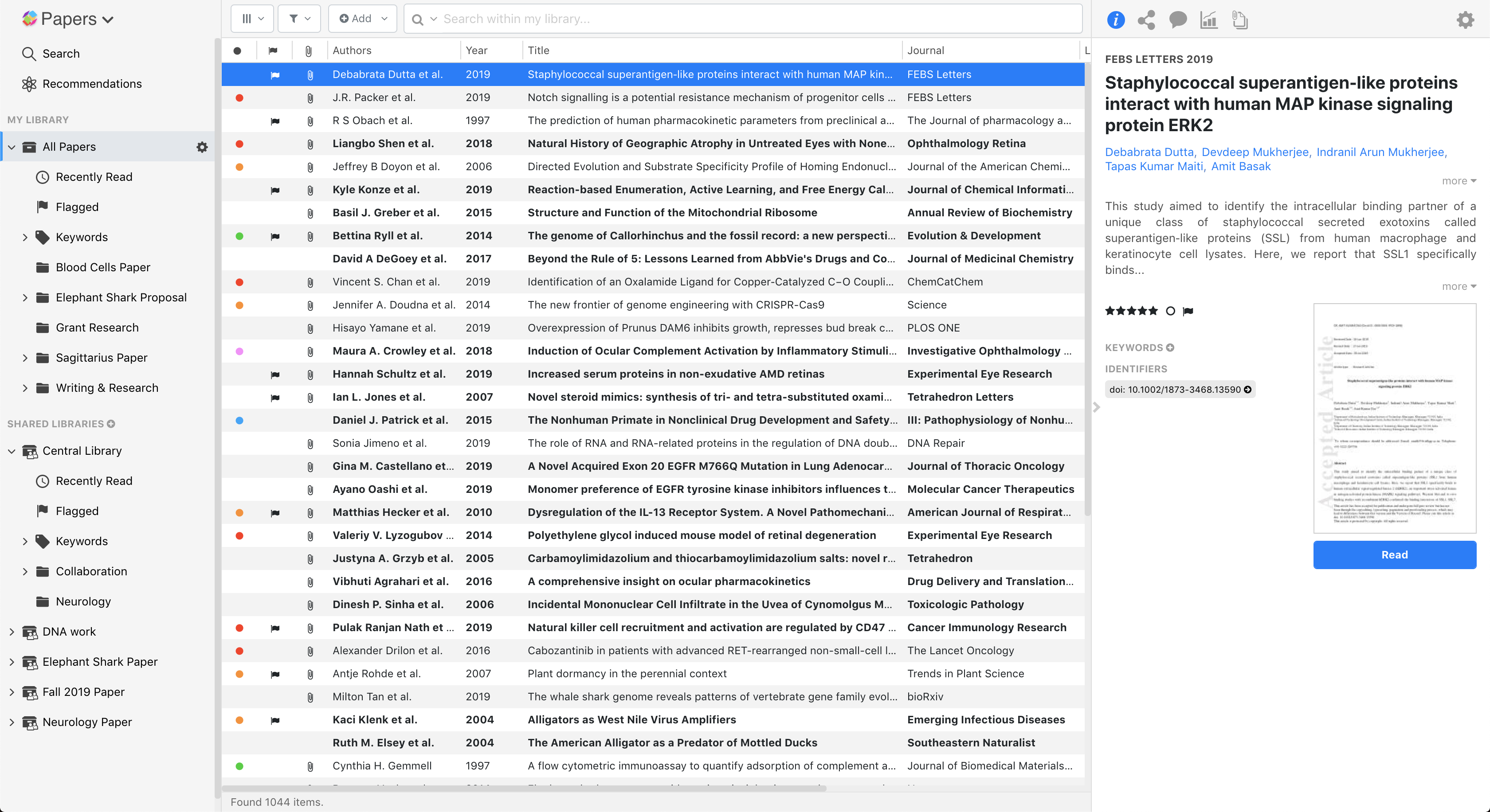
- Screenshot of ReadCube
- Developer: ReadCube
- Stable release: 3.4.20 (Mac), 3.2.57 (Windows), / August 2026 (Desktop)
- Operating system: Mac; Windows
- Type: Reference management software
- License: Proprietary
- Website: about.readcube.com

Papers, which is now consolidated into ReadCube, is a reference management software available for macOS and Windows. It was designed to facilitate the management of bibliographies and references for essays and articles. The software's primary function is to organize references and maintain a digital library of PDF documents.

== Overview ==
Papers was developed by Alexander Griekspoor and Tom Groothuis while studying towards their PhD diplomas at the Netherlands Cancer Institute. The pair worked on Papers to provide an approach to document management that was similar to the iTunes application on macOS, after they were faced with hundreds of digital publications in PDF format. Papers was originally released as a public preview in February 2007, followed by the full 1.0 version a few months later.

In 2013, a new version of the software was released, along with a new Apple app. Both products received a considerable amount of criticism from users, who experienced a number of issues, ranging from lost databases and annotations to incompatibility between mobile and desktop apps. Users criticized Mekentosj and Springer, the developer and owner of Papers, respectively, for releasing a beta version of the software and the pace at which they addressed many issues that rendered the software effectively unusable.

On March 16, 2016, ReadCube acquired Papers from Springer Nature for an undisclosed amount. ReadCube has been available since Fall 2019.

As of July 31, 2026, Papers was consolidated into ReadCube fully. Papers and ReadCube had been part of the same product family for years and this change moves them together under one name: ReadCube.

== Versions ==
=== Mac ===
With the release of Papers 2 in March 2011, Papers provides EndNote style reference citation features. It also allows users to access their library and insert citations across a variety of different applications, whether in documents, presentations, or in web browsers. Papers offers a number of features for collecting, curating, merging and linking articles.

Papers 3, a new version for Mac was released in late 2013. This version introduces a redesigned user interface and Dropbox based syncing, which has subsequently been expanded to other cloud-based repositories.

As of November 1st, 2018, Papers 3 is no longer available for sale and is no longer being actively developed. The new version of Papers is developed by ReadCube. It is primarily used to organize references and maintain a library of PDF documents and also provides a uniform interface for document repository searches, metadata editing, full screen reading and, a variety of ways to import and export documents.

=== Windows ===
Papers 2 for Windows was first released in 2012. A new version, now Papers 3 for Windows, was released late July 2014 following the redesign of the Mac and iOS applications earlier. This version was intended to streamline the user experience and the features available from the Mac application. Papers 3 for Windows also added unified search to its platform. It supported Dropbox syncing between Mac and iOS devices running Papers 3 as well as Papers Online. The Windows version of Papers 3 has been withdrawn from sale and is no longer available.

=== Browser ===
An online version of ReadCube runs on most modern Web browsers. Users can access their library by signing in through institutional or personal email addresses. Libraries have the ability to sync automatically and have unlimited cloud storage.

=== iPhone and iPad ===
Versions of ReadCube are available for free from the Apple App Store for iPhone and iPad. The latest version of ReadCube is available on the Mac App Store. This version includes the article management features, and adds freehand annotations and supports Apple Pencil to the standard annotation features. ReadCube for iOS can be synchronized via a cloud storage system provided by ReadCube.

=== Android ===
A version of ReadCube is available for Android users and can be downloaded via Google Play. It automatically syncs to the ReadCube desktop and web applications. ReadCube is a NoSQL-like storage for Java/Kotlin objects on Android with automatic schema migration support.

=== Papers Online (legacy) ===
Papers Online was a set of services released in conjunction with Papers 3 for Windows. It worked across a variety of platforms and offered users a means of sharing collections of articles. Papers 3 users could create shared collections, and access them from most devices. Shared collections were accessible by other Papers 3 users as well as individuals who were not currently using Papers 3. This version is no longer available.

== Awards ==
Papers won an Apple Design Award in 2007, for best Mac OS X Scientific Computing Solution.

== See also ==
- Comparison of reference management software for some comparisons with similar packages.
- ReadCube
