= Agenda (charity) =

UK-based charity

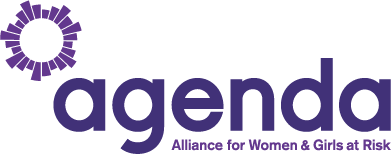
Agenda logo

Agenda is a UK-based charity which campaigns for women and girls at risk. The charity aims to highlight the needs of what it considers to be the most excluded women and girls: those who have experienced extensive violence, abuse, Psychological trauma, and economic inequality, including problems such as homelessness, incarceration, addiction, serious mental health issues, engagement in prostitution, and other forms of disadvantage. The organisation has 53 members, a mix of charities working with women across the various issues Agenda seeks to address.

== History ==
Agenda was brought together by a group of trusts, foundations and voluntary sector organisations building on work started with Baroness Corston’s 2007 report into women in the criminal justice system.

From 2008, a group of funders collaborated through the Corston Independent Funders Commission (CIFC) to improve the response to women in contact with the criminal justice system. Primarily focused on community alternatives to custody, the CIFC became interested in broadening its scope away from women already in the criminal justice system to look at a wider group of women and girls facing disadvantage. In partnership with Clinks, CIFC carried out a consultation with organisations working with vulnerable women and girls in 2013.

This consultation claimed that going into custody is just one of a range of negative outcomes for vulnerable women and girls. It found that many women and girls end up with other poor life trajectories including severe mental health problems, substance misuse issues, homelessness and involvement in prostitution.

The consultation showed that there was support to develop an alliance of those with an interest in these issues: Agenda was set up as a result. A Steering Group was set up to guide Agenda's priorities, chaired by Baroness Young of Hornsey.

== Research ==
In January 2016, Agenda published research claiming that one in 20 women in England have experienced extensive physical and sexual violence as both a child and an adult. The research also claims that women with the most extensive experiences of abuse also had very high rates of mental ill-health, disability, substance misuse, homelessness and poverty.
