= Spell Catcher =

Spell checking program

- Developer: Evan Gross
- Release: 1985
- Final release: 10.4.1 (macOS), 3.10.2 (Windows) / 12 December 2011
- Operating system: Atari TOS, Classic Mac OS, Windows
- Type: Spell checker
- License: Proprietary

Spell Catcher, originally known as Thunder!, is a stand-alone spell checker for Atari ST, Macintosh, and Microsoft Windows. It was published continually from 1985 until the untimely 2012 death of the primary developer, Evan Gross. Its original name refers to its lightning-fast speed, which set it apart from other spell checkers on the platform like Spellswell.

In addition to basic spell checking, later versions of the program offered a viewable dictionary and thesaurus, user-defined macro expansions, and auto-complete. Another notable feature was strong multilingual support, a rarity among such programs of the era. Over time, many of these features were also added to Mac OS X and Windows built-in spell checking functionality, but Spell Catcher remained in use due to its other features. It no longer runs under the most recent versions of macOS, which require 64-bit applications.

== History ==
The program was originally released in 1985 for the Atari ST platform by Toronto-based Batteries Included, (Note: InfoWorld first mentions the product in June 1986, which seems late for a product that shipped in 1985.) who sold it under the original name Thunder! The ST version was written by Mark Skapinker, who later went on to co-found Delrina. There were two spell checkers with similar names at the same time, Turbo Lightning for DOS, and Mac Lightning for the Mac. Thunder also included statistics functions, including a word count and "grade level".

For the Mac, Batteries Included hired Evan Gross who ported the system and released it a couple of months later. (Note: Likely in early 1986, sources are unclear.) Batteries Included was purchased by Electronic Arts (EA) in 1987, as part of an EA buying spree. They had no interest in the ST market and stopped sales of that version, while continuing Mac development. Thunder II was released in 1988, changing from a desk accessory to a control panel that hooked directly into the classic Mac OS text editing system to allow inline checking and replacement. During this period, the program won MacUser Eddy awards in 1986 and 1988.

In 1990, Gross was readying a version that ran under Apple's new System 7. EA had lost interest in the utilities market and sold the publishing rights to Baseline Publishing. The new Thunder 7 was released along with System 7 in 1991. The major addition for this version was the thesaurus. Another release, 7.1.5, added "Ghostwriter', which optionally recorded all typing as a form of emergency backup. Baseline disappeared in 1994 as the CEO raided the company's coffers, forcing Gross to try to regain the rights to the program to begin work with another publisher.

Casady & Greene expressed an interest, but would only consider it once the product was truly free and clear of Baseline. This took two years to arrange. The product re-launched in 1996 under the new name Spell Catcher. They also agreed to fund the development of a Microsoft Windows port, which launched in 1998 as Spell Checker Plus. Problems selling into the Windows market led to this product being only moderately successful despite being lauded by its users. A rewrite of the Mac version from THINK Pascal to Metrowerks C resulted in 1999's Spell Catcher 8, which added extensive multilingual support. A port of this version to Windows became 2000's Spell Catcher Plus 2.0.

A complete ground-up rewrite was needed for Mac OS X, released in 2003 as Spell Catcher X. Just before shipments began, in July 2003 Casady & Greene went bankrupt. The company took the time to return the rights of their programs back to the authors, and Gross began sales of the product under his newly formed Rainmaker Research. The company continued publishing the product, releasing the 2.6 upgrade for Windows in 2005, and constantly updating it for newly released versions of macOS until 10.4.1 in 2011. Gross died in 2012, receiving widespread notice in the Mac field. This version is known to work on at least macOS 10.14, OS X Mojave, but as a 32-bit application it will not run on the most modern macOS releases.

== Description ==
The initial versions for the ST and Mac were in the form of desk accessories, but later became control panel systems which allowed it to patched the operating system to receive all keystrokes, allowing it to perform spell checking in realtime as the user typed. The program could be set to beep or (later) flash the menu bar to indicate an error. Later versions on macOS could instead color the words to show issues, removing the beeps and flashes that reviewers found annoying.

The interface was invoked with a control key sequence, displaying a dialog box with suggested corrections. Alternately, the program could be used in non-interactive mode by selecting Check Now or Check Selection from the menu. The interface, which could also be manually invoked though the Control Panel or from a menubar widget, also included the various user settings and access to other features. For instance, you could select which programs were to be used with Thunder while ignoring the rest. This list could also include desk accessories.

The program normally shipped with two dictionaries, one with about 50,000 words and the other, for machines with more memory, about 86,000. It also included several supplementary dictionaries with specialized terminology including computer terms and common contractions. Users can add words to any of the dictionaries, or create their own new ones. Oddly, it did not allow you to remove words once added.

== Reception ==
Thunder and Spell Catcher received positive reviews throughout its history, winning many "best of" awards and constantly being rated highly by its customers. Gross himself was always open to his customers and there are many testimonials to his response to problems and feature requests.

Because it was a writer's tool, it was found in places not normally seen for software reviews. For instance, early in its life, United Press International reviewed the program, describing "Thunder II from Electronic Arts is a fast, accurate and remarkably easy-to-use spell checker for Macintosh computers that works within most major applications, ranging from word processors to spreadsheets" and concluding "it's an excellent bargain and a welcome addition to anyone's System folder."

In a 1987 comparison of a number of spell checking programs for the Mac, InfoWorld called it a "fast and capable tool", noting in the same review that Spellswell took over three minutes to check a 50 kB file that Thunder! did on-the-fly. They did note a number of "quirks", including the loss of style information when performing replacements in Microsoft Word and that MacWrite files could only be checked if they were 32 kB or smaller. They conclude that "Thunder is a relatively fast and inexpensive, and its glossary and interactive typing features make it a more useful writing took than most. But we wish it didn't have those limits with MacWrite 4.5 and Microsoft 3.01." Summing up all of the products, they note "Among the desk accessory programs we checked, we liked Thunder the best."

By the time of Spell Catcher 8, the program had a number of new features like corrections-on-the-fly that replaced commonly misspelled words without having to call up the UI. It also added the Modify Selection which changed things like straight to curly quotes or back, removing doubles spaces and similar options. A Macworld review in 1998 noted that it lacked a real grammar checker, but concluded that "For those who are sloppy typists or work with programs that don’t include spelling checkers, Spell Catcher is a must-have product."

Even late in its history, when macOS had its own spell and grammar checking, the program continued to garner excellent reviews. In 2010, Macworld rated it 4.5 out of five, summing it up by saying "If you find OS X’s built-in spell-checker and thesaurus good enough, you have no need for Spell Catcher X. But if you spend the majority of your computer time typing words, Spell Catcher X is a great addition to your toolkit."
