= Fugu (software) =

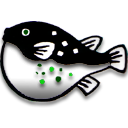
- Developer: University of Michigan Research Systems Unix Group
- Stable release: 1.2.0 / 2 May 2005
- Operating system: Mac OS X
- Type: SFTP
- License: Fugu
- Website: rsug.itd.umich.edu/software/fugu

Fugu is an SFTP client for Mac OS X. It has been abandoned by the developers since 2011. The software from that time is available on SourceForge.

Fugu was developed by the University of Michigan's Research Systems Unix Group (RSUG). It is a graphical shell for OpenSSH tools that provides a simple interface to all of the features that SSH has.

The name of the program is a homage to the Blowfish encryption algorithm used by OpenSSH, as fugu is a type of blowfish.
