= Airmail (cocktail) =

Rum-based cocktail

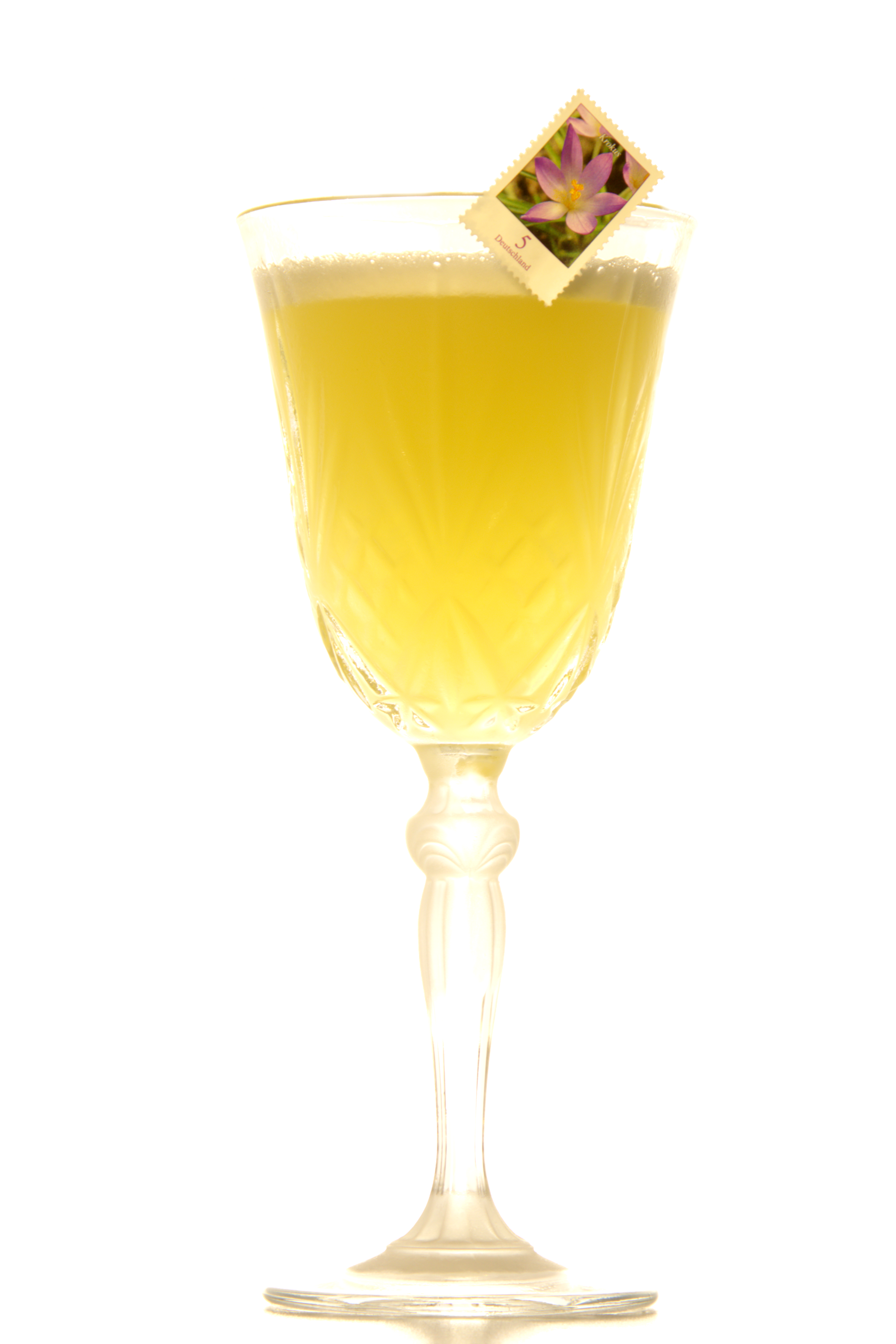
Airmail Cocktail, garnished with a postal stamp

The Airmail or Air Mail (also Airmail cocktail) is a classic cocktail based on rum, lime or lemon juice, honey, and sparkling wine. It was probably created during or shortly after the period of prohibition in the United States of America or on Cuba, i.e. in the 1920s or 1930s.

Airmail Cocktail is also a brand of ready-to-drink cocktails created and produced in Cognac (France) since 2020.

== History ==
As with the slightly older Aviation cocktail, to whose recipe there is no similarity, the name is reminiscent of aviation which developed rapidly at that time. In those years when international telephone connections were still a rarity, airmail was the fastest means of communication across national borders. Because of prohibition, Americans were only able to legally drink alcohol abroad until 1933. Cuba, among other countries, benefited from this as a pronounced bar and cocktail culture began developing on the island in the 1920s. Since 1925, flights were available from Key West to Havana, and in 1930, a regular airmail service was established to and from the island. Shortly after, the Airmail Cocktail appeared for the first time in an advertising brochure of the then still Cuba-based rum manufacturer Bacardí.

In 1941, the recipe was published in a mixology book. In his recipe collections, Just Cocktails (1939) and Here's How (1941), the author W.C. Whitfield had collected numerous drinks from the years of prohibition and provided them with comments partly in laconic style. As far as the Airmail Cocktail is concerned, Whitfield commented on it ‘It ought to make you fly high’. The cocktail gained further popularity when the recipe was mentioned in the Handbook for Hosts in Esquire magazine in 1949.

In the following decades, the cocktail wasn't very popular, having been published rarely. In the 2010s, however, the cocktail experienced another boom by being mentioned in the ‘PDT Cocktail Book’ (2011) and by the promotion of alcoholic drinks by the brand Bacardí.

== Ingredients and similar cocktails ==
The basis for the Airmail Cocktail is a sour mixture of rum, lime juice and honey (or honey syrup), which are first shaken on ice in a cocktail shaker and then strained into a pre-cooled Cocktail glass. The mixture is then topped up with sparkling wine. The drink is similar to the Canchánchara, which consists of the same ingredients except for the sparkling wine. ‘Esquire’ magazine calls the Airmail Cocktail a "combination of the cocktails French 75 and Honey Bee". The French 75 is a Champagne-based drink and a classic mixture of Gin, lemon juice and sugar syrup, while the Honey Bee consists of white rum, honey and lemon juice and therefore is akin to a Daiquiri. A modern cocktail which shares the ingredients rum, lime juice and champagne with the Airmail Cocktail is the Old Cuban, which was created in 2001.

Most recipes feature a mixture ratio of 3 cl rum, 1.5 cl lime juice and 1.5 cl honey syrup, which are then topped up with 3 cl champagne and either garnished with a slice of lime on the rim of the glass or not garnished at all - as usual for cocktails based on sparkling wine. The magazine Imbibe recommends a dash of Angostura (bitters) and a mint leaf, while the rum manufacturer Bacardí recommends a postage stamp as garnish.

The Cocktail can be prepared with dark or white rum. Dark rum is best complemented with the addition of a comparatively aromatic honey, while white rum prefers the use of a mild honey like Acacia blossom honey. Cuban rum is often recommended. Substitution of the lime juice with lemon juice is possible. The honey syrup used for the cocktail is a mixture of 2 parts honey and 1 part water, which is easier to incorporate into mixtures and to add to taste than pure honey. In most cases, the cocktail is topped up with dry champagne, Crémant or sparkling wine (less so with Prosecco).

It is usually served straight up in a pre-cooled champagne flute or coupe. Some recipes call for much larger quantities of liquid and proportionally more sparkling wine which therefore suggests serving the cocktail in a Collins glass.
