= Sky Gamblers =

2011 video game series

- Platforms: Android, iOS, OS X, Windows, Nintendo Switch
- Release: 2011-2022
- Genre: Flight-simulation

Sky Gamblers is a series of flight simulation games released on Android, iOS, OS X, Windows and Nintendo Switch. Sky Gamblers: Rise Of Glory (2011) and Sky Gamblers: Air Supremacy (2012) were developed by Namco Networks America and Revo Solutions (recently renamed to Atypical Games), while Sky Gamblers: Storm Raiders (2012), Sky Gamblers: Cold War (2013), Sky Gamblers: Storm Raiders 2 (2018), and Sky Gamblers: Air Supremacy 2 (2022) were developed independently by Atypical Games. In 2015, both "Rise of Glory" and "Air Supremacy" were handed over to Atypical Games as publishing contracts expired.

The series has been described as a "pioneer in the genre."

Presumably, the game could be based on the real 77th Fighter Squadron, called the "Gamblers".

Three of the games in the series have also been released on Nintendo Switch, while all of the games were released on Android, iOS and OS X. Sky Gamblers: Storm Raiders also released for Windows.

== Critical reception ==
- Sky Gamblers: Rise Of Glory has a Metacritic rating of 86% based on 4 critic reviews.
- Sky Gamblers: Air Supremacy has a Metacritic rating of 86% based on 9 critic reviews.
- Sky Gamblers: Storm Raiders has a Metacritic rating of 89% based on 6 critic reviews.
- Sky Gamblers: Cold War has a Metacritic rating of 73% based on 9 critic reviews.
