= Vito Technology =

Software development company

Vito Technology Inc.
- Industry: Software development
- Founded: 2001
- Key people: Victor Toporkov (CEO); Murad Nazaraliev (Managing Director)
- Website: vitotechnology.com

Vito Technology, Inc. is an American-German mobile software development company, best known for the educational application Star Walk for iOS, which has had more than 5 million downloads since its release in 2009.

== History ==
The company is based in Alexandria, Virginia and is headed by Victor Toporkov. Since it entered the mobile software market in 2001, it has developed products for Windows Mobile.

Vito Technology Inc. has over 30 employees in the United States and Germany.

The latest Vito Technology endeavors include iOS and Web 2.0 software development. Educational apps such as Star Walk and Solar Walk have been on top of the educational chart in the App Store for over a year. In addition, the company won an award at the Apple Design Awards in 2010 for its Star Walk app for iPad.

== Applications ==
- Star Walk
- Solar Walk
- Geo Walk
- Dino Walk: Continental Drift
- Gyrocompass 3D
- Holy Wars
- Swine Time
- Star Walk 2
- Solar Walk 2
- Sky Tonight
