= Leo's Fortune =

2014 puzzle video game

- Developers: 1337 & Senri
- Platforms: iOS; Android; Windows Phone; PlayStation 4; Microsoft Windows; OS X; Xbox One; Nintendo Switch
- Release: Android, iOS, Windows Phone; April 23, 2014; Microsoft Windows, OS X, PlayStation 4; September 8, 2015; Xbox One; September 11, 2015; Nintendo Switch; November 29, 2024
- Genre: Puzzle game
- Mode: Single-player

Leo's Fortune is a platform treasure based game for iOS, Android, Windows Phone and the Amazon App Store developed by 1337 & Senri LLC. It revolves around Leopold, the title character, a mustached "fluff ball" roly-poly whose fortune (gold) is stolen. The player guides Leopold through 2.5 dimensional platform levels as he searches for his treasure. There are currently 24 (including bonus levels), divided into 5 chapters.

The game was released for mobile devices on April 23, 2014. Microsoft Windows, OS X, and PlayStation 4 versions were released on September 8, 2015. A version for the Nintendo Switch was released on November 29, 2024.

== Summary ==
Leo is a famous Engineer who comes from a rich family, until one day his entire fortune is stolen. Recounting past experiences, Leo suspects his relatives Cousin Victor, Aunt Olga, and Uncle Sergej, who also lost their fortunes in tragic accidents, of being the culprits. Leo sets out to find the thief, and is followed by the steaming apparatus, the machine that keeps the world in order, who is seemingly faltering at its job as thorns and traps keep appearing all over the land. After travelling through trails, harbors, desert ruins and mountains, he encounters his relatives who turn out to not be the thieves and lead him to a snowy landscape where Leo finds the steam apparatus's facility. There, Leo encounters his wife Matilda, who had left years ago without Leo noticing, and had taken his gold because she believed it "took his decency". She leads him to his gold, but on the way Leo discovers the apparatus has no more liquid metal to be able to continue functioning. Leo makes the decision to give his gold to the machine, thus losing his fortune again. Matilda, thankful for his kindness, walks home with Leo.

== Gameplay ==
The game is a 2D sidescroller that is played using touch controls. Leo can slide along the ground to move and can jump by tapping the screen. Leo can also inflate to descend slower and solve certain puzzles and platforming challenges. There are gold coins trailed throughout the levels, collecting them all earning a star at the end of the stage, along with not losing any lives and completing the level in a certain timeframe. The stars are used to play bonus levels.

== Critical reception ==
The game has a Metacritic rating of 84% based on 22 critic reviews.
