= Karelia Watson =

Application for the Macintosh platform

Watson
- Screenshot of Watson using the Amazon plug-in
- Developer: Karelia Software
- Release: November 27, 2001
- Operating system: Mac OS X
- Type: Web services
- License: Proprietary
- Website: www.karelia.com/watson/

Watson is a discontinued software program to provide Internet content through a familiar Mac OS X-like interface through the use of plug-ins. Plug-ins can be programmed in the Objective-C language using the Cocoa frameworks included with the Mac OS X operating system.

Watson was originally released by Karelia Software for the Macintosh on November 27, 2001. On September 18, 2002, Apple bundled a similar program, Sherlock 3, with Mac OS X v10.2. Advocates of Watson claim that Apple copied the features of Watson without permission, compensation, or attribution. Apple, however, claims that a Watson-like program was simply the natural evolution of Sherlock 2. At Sun Microsystems' JavaOne conference in June 2004, Sun announced that they had licensed the Watson technology and were porting it to the Java programming language under the name Project Alameda. On October 5, development of the Cocoa-based version of Watson ceased. On November 24, Dan Wood, Karelia owner and Watson lead developer, made the last version of Watson available free of charge by posting a registration code on his blog.

== See also ==
- Site-specific browser
