= Tweetie =

Twitter client for Apple devices

- Developer: Twitter Inc. (Previously atebits LLC)
- Release: November 19, 2008; 17 years ago
Final release
- iOS: 3.3.6 / August 16, 2011
- Mac: 2.1.1 / June 1, 2011
- Operating system: iOS, macOS
- Type: Twitter client
- License: Commercial proprietary software

Tweetie is a discontinued client for the social networking service Twitter. There was a mobile version that ran on iPhone, iPod Touch, and iPad, and a desktop version ran on Mac OS X Leopard, Snow Leopard and Lion (respectively 10.5, 10.6 and 10.7).

Both the iOS and Mac versions of Tweetie were acquired by Twitter on April 9, 2010, and were re-released as the official Twitter clients for iOS and Mac.

== History ==
Tweetie 2.0 for iPhone was the first app to introduce the pull-to-refresh user interface mechanism. The Mac OS X version of Twitter had many of the same features as its mobile sibling. In addition to a free advertising supported version, the paid iOS and OS X versions cost $2.99 and $19.95 respectively. The beta of the Mac version was leaked to the popular torrent site Demonoid a week before the official release.

== Acquisition by Twitter ==
On April 9, 2010, Twitter announced that the company had acquired Tweetie. Twitter stated that the acquisition stemmed from the lack of an official, Twitter-branded mobile application. Tweetie was rebranded as "Twitter for iPhone" and released on May 19, 2010. The company's founder, Loren Brichter, became part of Twitter's mobile division and helped launch the "Twitter for iPad" application.

On January 6, 2011, Twitter announced that the company had also acquired the desktop version of Tweetie, changing the name to "Twitter for Mac". "Twitter for Mac" was launched on the new Mac App Store the same day. On Tuesday, May 21, 2013, Twitter announced that certain patents related to Tweetie would never be used except to defend Twitter.

Ultimately "Twitter for Mac" was discontinued after a very slow maintenance schedule in March 2018, being eventually replaced by the iOS version compiled using Catalyst in October 2019. The Catalyst app has been silently discontinued since the acquisition of Twitter by Elon Musk, and was replaced by the iPad app on M1 Macs.
