= Diary =

Record of events with entries arranged by date

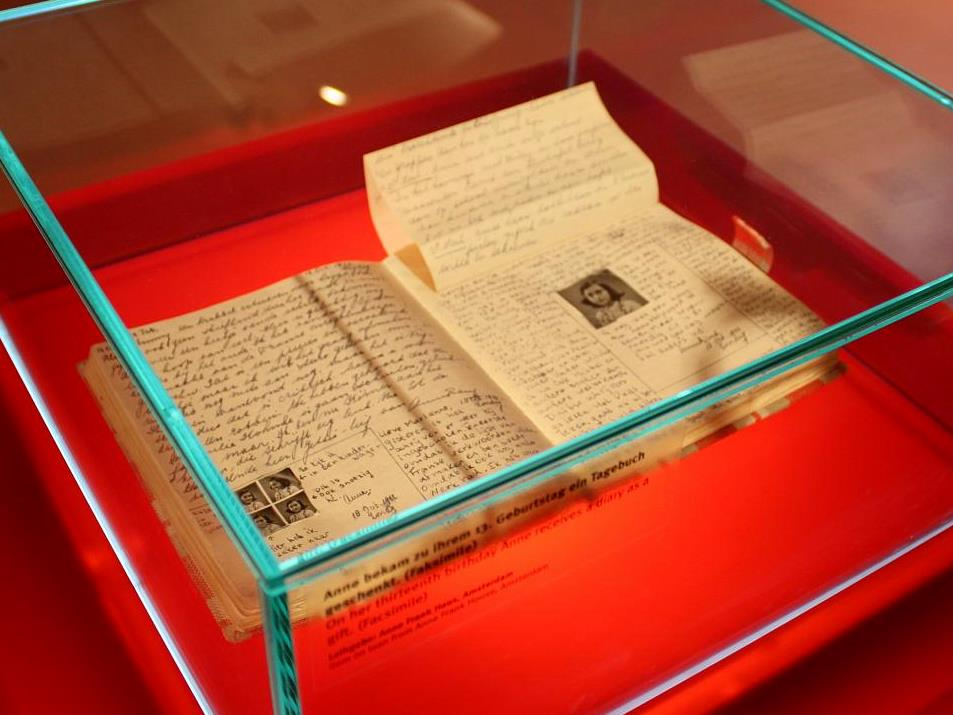
A facsimile of the original diary of Anne Frank on display in Berlin

A diary is a written or audiovisual memorable record, with discrete entries arranged by date reporting on what has happened over the course of a day or other period. Diaries have traditionally been handwritten but are now also often digital. A personal diary may include a person's experiences, thoughts, and/or feelings, excluding comments on current events outside the writer's direct experience. Someone who keeps a diary is known as a diarist. Diaries undertaken for institutional purposes play a role in many aspects of human civilization, including government records (e.g. Hansard), business ledgers, and military records. In British English, the word may also denote a preprinted journal format.

Today the term is generally employed for personal diaries, normally intended to remain private or to have a limited circulation amongst friends or relatives. The word "journal" may be sometimes used for "diary," but generally a diary has (or intends to have) daily entries (from the Latin word for 'day'), whereas journal-writing can be less frequent.

Although a diary may provide information for a memoir, autobiography or biography, it is generally written not with the intention of being published as it stands, but for the author's own use. However, there is internal evidence in some diaries (e.g. those of Marie Bashkirtseff, Ned Rorem, Alan Clark, Tony Benn or Simon Gray) that they are written with eventual publication in mind, with the intention of self-vindication (pre- or posthumous), or simply for profit.

By extension, the term diary is also used to mean a printed publication of a written diary; and may also refer to other terms of journal including electronic formats (e.g. blogs).

== Etymology ==
The word 'diary' comes from the Latin diarium ("daily allowance," from dies, "day"). The word 'journal' comes from the same root (diurnus, "of the day") through the Old French jurnal (the modern French for 'day' being jour).

The earliest recorded use of the word 'diary' to refer to a book in which a daily record was written was in Ben Jonson's comedy Volpone in 1605.

== History ==
The earliest known book resembling a diary is the Diary of Merer, an ancient Egyptian logbook whose author described the transportation of limestone from Tura to Giza, likely to clad the outside of the Great Pyramid. The oldest extant diaries come from Middle Eastern and East Asian cultures, although the even earlier work To Myself (Τὰ εἰς ἑαυτόν), today known as the Meditations, written in Greek by the Roman emperor Marcus Aurelius in the second half of the 2nd century AD, already displays many characteristics of a diary. Pillowbooks of Japanese court ladies and Asian travel journals offer some aspects of this genre of writing, although they rarely consist exclusively of diurnal records.

In the medieval Near East, Arabic diaries were written from before the 10th century. The earliest surviving diary of this era which most resembles the modern diary was that of Abu Ali ibn al-Banna in the 11th century. His diary is the earliest known to be arranged in order of date (ta'rikh in Arabic), very much like modern diaries.

The precursors of the diary in the modern sense include daily notes of medieval mystics, concerned mostly with inward emotions and outward events perceived as spiritually important (e.g. Elizabeth of Schönau, Agnes Blannbekin, and perhaps also, in the lost vernacular account of her visions, Beatrice of Nazareth).

From the Renaissance on, some individuals wanted not only to record events, as in medieval chronicles and itineraries, but also to put down their own opinions and express their hopes and fears, without any intention to publish their notes. One of the early preserved examples is the anonymous Journal d'un bourgeois de Paris covering the years 1405–1449, giving subjective commentaries on current events. Famous 14th to 16th century Renaissance examples, which appeared much later as books, were the diaries by the Florentines Buonaccorso Pitti and Gregorio Dati and the Venetian Marino Sanuto the Younger. These diaries include records of even less important everyday occurrences together with much reflection, emotional experience and personal impressions.

In the 19th century pocket diaries became a popular stationery item offered by many book publishers.

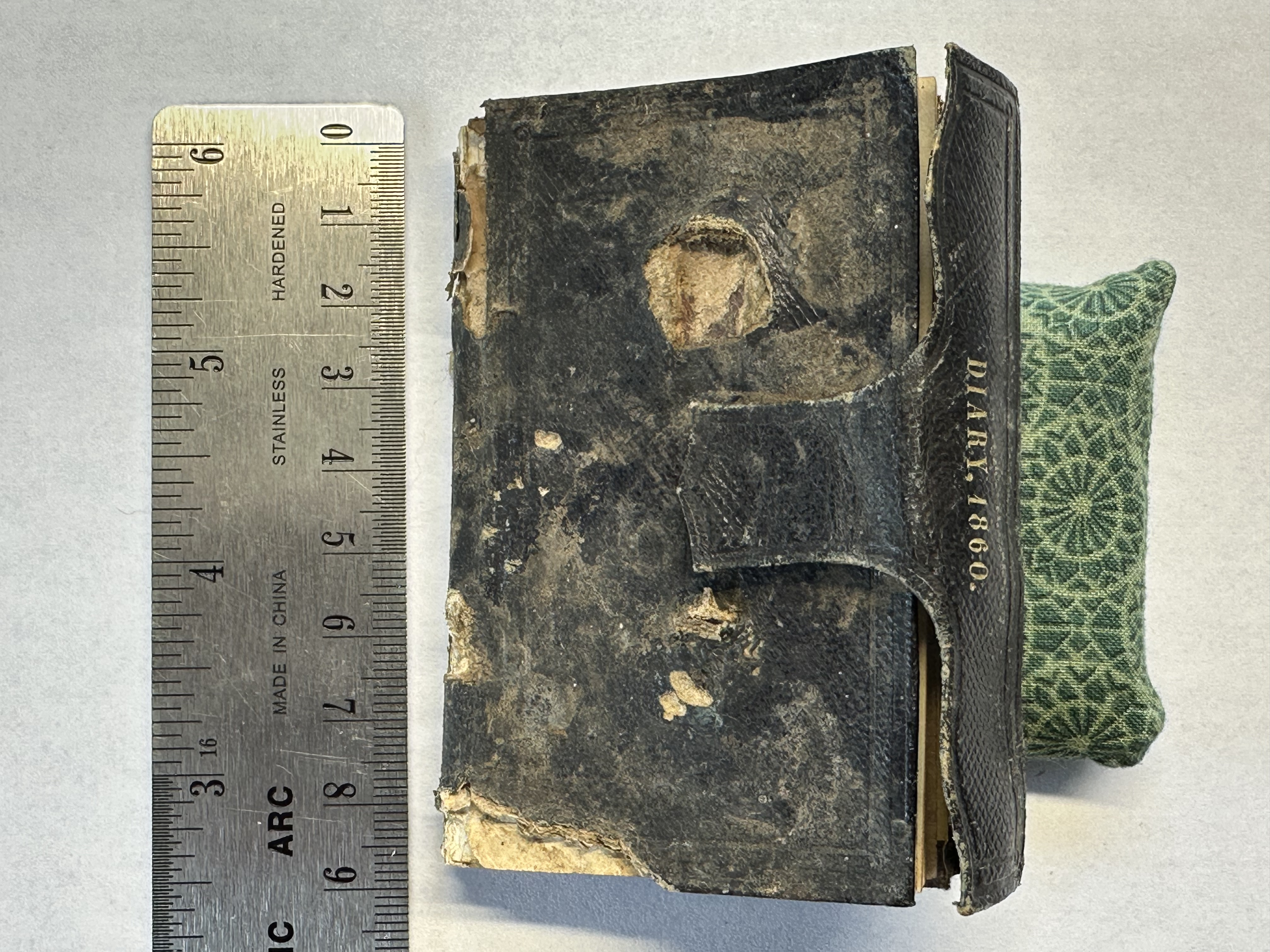
Pocket diary 1860 with ruler for scale

Publishers included almanac information in the front pages of these books followed by pages with preprinted dates and space for the diarist to write. Depending on the size of the book, diary entries were limited to a page or less. These small books often included a file pocket built into the back cover and a wrap-around closure.

== Published diaries ==
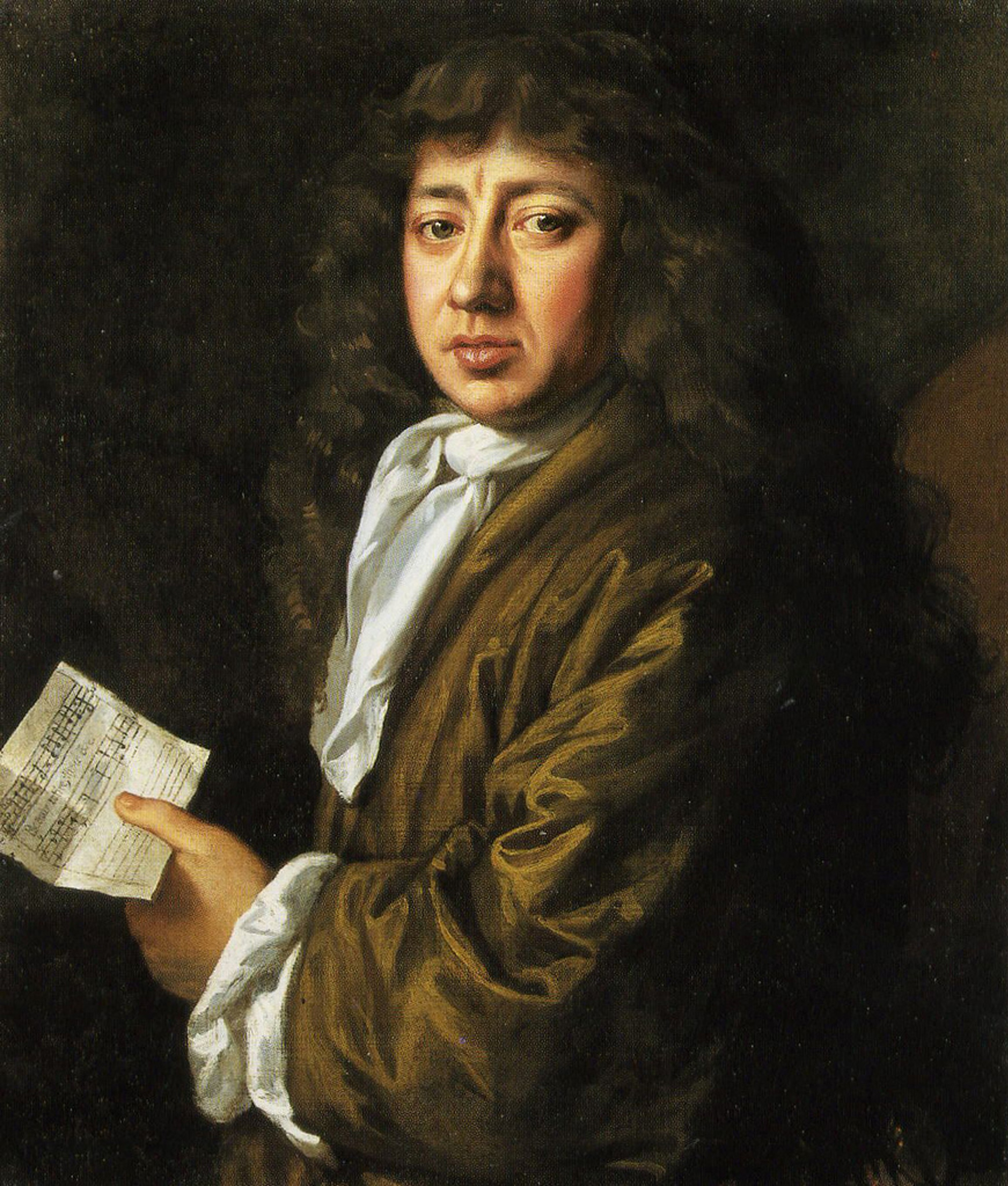
Samuel Pepys

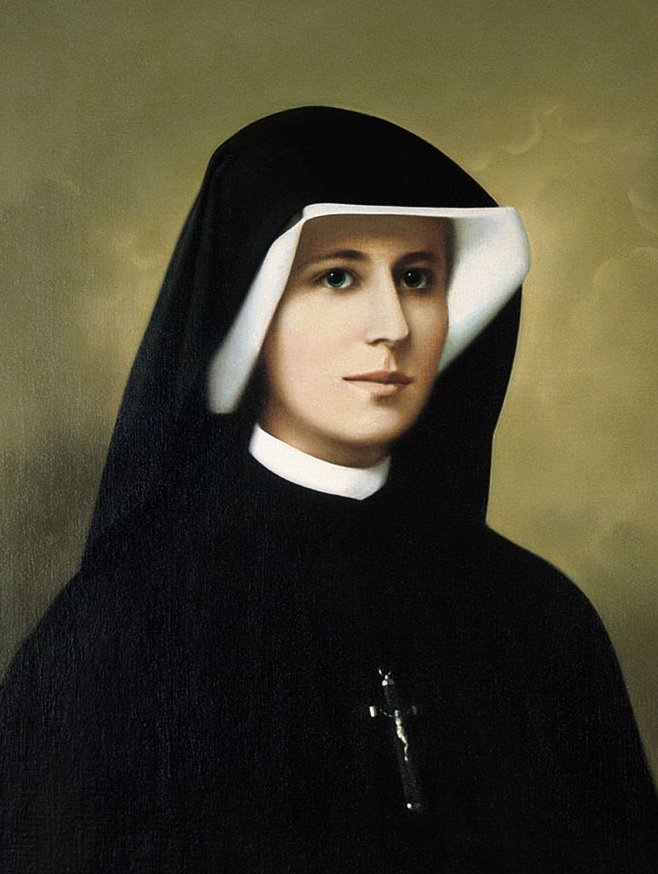
Faustina Kowalska

Many diaries of notable figures have been published and form an important element of autobiographical literature.

Samuel Pepys (1633–1703) is the earliest diarist who is well known today; his diaries, preserved in Magdalene College, Cambridge, were first transcribed and published in 1825. Pepys was amongst the first who took the diary beyond mere business transaction notation, into the realm of the personal. Pepys' contemporary John Evelyn also kept a notable diary, and their works are among the most important primary sources for the English Restoration period, and consist of eyewitness accounts of many great events, such as the Great Plague of London, and the Great Fire of London.

The practice of posthumous publication of diaries of literary and other notables began in the 19th century. As examples, the Grasmere Journal of Dorothy Wordsworth (1771–1855) was published in 1897; the journals of Fanny Burney (1752–1840) were published in 1889; the diaries of Henry Crabb Robinson (1776–1867) were published in 1869.

Among important U.S. Civil War diaries are those of George Templeton Strong, a New York City lawyer, and Mary Chesnut, the wife of a Confederate officer. The diary of Jemima Condict, living in the area of what is now West Orange, New Jersey, includes local observations of the American Revolutionary War.

Since the 19th century the publication of diaries by their authors has become commonplace – notably amongst politicians seeking justification but also amongst artists and litterateurs of all descriptions. Amongst late 20th-century British published political diaries, those of Richard Crossman, Tony Benn and Alan Clark are representative, the latter being more indiscreet, in the tradition of the diaries of Chips Channon. In Britain in the field of the arts notable diaries were published by James Lees-Milne, Roy Strong and Peter Hall. Harold Nicolson in the mid-20th century covered both politics and the arts.

One of the most famous modern diaries, widely read and translated, is the posthumously published The Diary of a Young Girl by Anne Frank, who wrote it while in hiding during the German occupation of Amsterdam in the 1940s. Otto Frank edited his daughter's diary and arranged for its publication after the war. Many edits were made before the diary was published in other countries. This was due to sexually explicit material, which also led to some libraries banning the book.

The writing of diaries was also often practiced from the 20th century onwards as a conscious act of self-exploration (of greater or lesser sincerity) – examples being the diaries of Carl Jung, Aleister Crowley and Anaïs Nin. Among important diaries by 20th-century literary figures are those of Franz Kafka, Edmund Wilson and the French writer Paul Léautaud (1872–1956). The self-reflective Diary: Divine Mercy in My Soul written by Saint Faustina contains accounts of her visions and conversations with Jesus.

A strong psychological effect may arise from having an audience for one's self-expression, even if this is the book one writes in, only read by oneself – particularly in adversity. Anne Frank went so far as to address her diary as "Kitty." Friedrich Kellner, a court official in Nazi Germany, thought of his diary as a weapon for any future fight against tyrants and terrorism, and named it 'Mein Widerstand', My Opposition. Victor Klemperer was similarly concerned with recording for the future the tyrannies and hypocrisies of Nazi Germany and of its East German successor state in his diaries. However in these cases, the authors did not anticipate publication.

== Internet diaries ==
As internet access became commonly available, many people adopted it as another medium in which to chronicle their lives with the added dimension of an audience. The first online diary is thought to be Claudio Pinhanez's Open Diary, published at the MIT Media Lab website from 14 November 1994 until 1996. Other early online diarists include Justin Hall, who began eleven years of personal online diary-writing in 1994, Carolyn Burke, who started publishing Carolyn's Diary on 3 January 1995, and Bryon Sutherland, who announced his diary The Semi-Existence of Bryon in a USENET newsgroup on 19 April 1995.

The internet has also served as a way to bring previously unpublished diaries to the attention of historians and other readers, such as the diary of Michael Shiner, an enslaved person in the 19th century who documented his life in Washington, D.C.

Web-based services such as Open Diary (started in October 1998) and LiveJournal (January 1999) soon appeared to streamline and automate online publishing, but growth in personal storytelling came with the emergence of blogs. While the format first focused on external links and topical commentary, widespread blogging tools were quickly used to create web journals. Recent advances have also been made to enable the privacy of internet diary entries. For example, some diary software now stores entries in an encrypted format, such as 256-bit AES (Advanced Encryption Standard) encryption, and others only permit access to the diary after correct PIN entry on a secure USB device.

== Digital diaries ==
With the popularization of mobile apps, diary or journaling apps have become available for iOS and Android. Proponents have cited numerous reasons for journaling using digital applications, including ease and speed of typing, mobile portability, and search capabilities. Digital diaries are also tailored towards shorter-form, in-the-moment writing, similar to user engagement with social media services such as Facebook, Twitter and Instagram. Apple released a journal app with its iOS 17.2 update, pulling suggestions for entries based on locations the user has visited, music they have listened to, and photos from their photo library alongside prompts.

== Other forms of diaries ==
=== Personal organizer ===
A personal organizer is a form of diary to list actions and tasks for the day, which are recorded in a log, often using symbols to differentiate and categorize items.

=== Freewriting ===
In free writing, the diarist sets aside a few minutes each day to write without any constraints, letting thoughts flow freely and allowing the subconscious mind to express itself. Freewriting can unearth hidden thoughts and emotions, fostering self-discovery.

=== Gardening journal ===
A gardening journal helps gardeners improve their efforts over time by providing a historical record of actions taken, the weather and other elements, and the results.

=== Gratitude journal ===
A gratitude journal is a diary of things for which someone is grateful. Keeping a gratitude journal is a popular practice in the field of positive psychology.

=== Sleep diary ===
A sleep diary or sleep log is a tool used in the diagnosis and treatment of sleep disorders or to keep track of dreams had in order to gain insight to the subconscious or for further contemplation.

=== Tagebuch ===
The German Tagebuch ('days-book') is normally rendered as "diary" in English, but the term encompasses workbooks or working journals as well as diaries proper. For example, the notebooks of the Austrian writer Robert Musil and of the German-Swiss artist Paul Klee are called Tagebücher.

=== Travel journal ===
A travel journal, travel diary, or road journal, is the documentation of a journey or series of journeys.

=== War diary ===
A war diary is a regularly updated official record of a military unit's administration and activities during wartime maintained by an officer in the unit. Such diaries can form an important source of historical information, for example about long and complex battles in World War I.

== Fictional diaries ==
There are numerous examples of fictional diaries. One of the earliest printed fictional diaries was the humorous Diary of a Nobody by George Grossmith and his brother Weedon. 20th-century examples include radio broadcasts (e.g. Mrs. Dale's Diary) and published books (e.g. the Diaries of Adrian Mole). Both prompted long-running satirical features in the magazine Private Eye: the former entitled Mrs Wilson's Diary in reference to Mary Wilson, wife of Prime Minister Harold Wilson, the latter entitled The Secret Diary of John Major Aged 47¾ and written as a pastiche of the Adrian Mole diaries from the perspective of the then-Prime Minister John Major. Another famous example of the use of fictional diaries as prose is Bram Stoker's Dracula. A modern example includes the Diary of a Wimpy Kid series where each book of the series is written in a first-person view of the main character, as if the book were an actual diary. Other examples are the Bert Diaries and the cellphone diaries in the Japanese manga and anime television series Future Diary.

== See also ==
- Art diary
- Autobiography
- Automatic indexing
- Bullet journal
- Coloring diary
- Commentarii
- Commonplace book
- Diary studies
- Electronic organizer
- Fake memoirs
- Hipster PDA
- Intrapersonal communication
- Journal
- List of books on diaries and journals
- List of diarists
- List of dream diaries
- List of fictional diaries
- List of longest diaries
- Logbook
- Nikki bungaku / Poetic diary
- Personal knowledge base
- Category:Diaries
- Category:Diarists
