= Journal =

A journal, from the Old French journal (meaning "daily"), may refer to:

- Bullet journal, a method of personal organization
- Diary, a record of personal secretive thoughts and as open book to personal therapy or used to feel connected to oneself. A record of what happened over the course of a day or other period
- Daybook, also known as a general journal, a daily record of financial transactions
- Journal (Apple), a personal journaling app developed by Apple Inc. for iPhones
- Logbook, a record of events important to the operation of a vehicle, facility, or otherwise
- Transaction log, a chronological record of data processing
- Travel journal, a record of the traveller's experience during the course of their journey

In publishing, journal can refer to various periodicals or serials:

- Academic journal, an academic or scholarly periodical
  - Medical journal, an academic journal focusing on medicine
  - Law review, a professional journal focusing on legal interpretation
- Magazine, non-academic or scholarly periodicals in general
  - Trade magazine, a magazine of interest to those of a particular profession or trade
  - Literary magazine, a magazine devoted to literature in a broad sense
- Newspaper, a periodical covering general news and current events in politics, business, sports and art
  - Gazette, a type of newspaper, often a newspaper of record
  - Government gazette, a government newspaper which publishes public or legal notices

Journal may also refer to:

== Arts and entertainment ==
- Journal (Canadian TV series), a 1977 Canadian short film television series
- Journal (German TV programme), a 1992–2015 German news programme that aired on Deutsche Welle
- Journals (album), 2013 album by Justin Bieber
- Journals (Cobain), 2002 collection by Kurt Cobain
- Journal, an autobiographical work by Charles Du Bos published from 1946 to 1961

== Other uses ==
- Journal (mechanical device), the section of a shaft that turns in a bearing
- Journal entry, an accounting transaction in the double-entry bookkeeping system
- Journal Peaks, Palmer Land, Antarctica

== See also ==
- The Journal (disambiguation), several publications and TV programs that carry this name
- List of journals (disambiguation)
- Notebook
- Record
