= Richard Winwood =

Richard Winwood may refer to:

- Richard Winwood (MP) (1609–1688), English MP for Windsor
- Richard I. Winwood (born 1943), American writer
