= Thomas Letts =

English stationer and printer

Thomas Letts (1803 – 1873) was an English stationer and printer who popularised the diary. He was born at Stockwell, London, the son of John Letts, a bookbinder and printer of the Royal Exchange. In 1816, his father published ‘Letts's diary or bills owed book and almanack’ as the first commercially produced diary, which Thomas developed into dozens of differently printed and bound, annual publications.

Thomas took over the family-owned company in 1835, printing a range of diaries that stretched from small pocket diaries to commercial foolscap folio one-day-per-page editions. Additionally, his factories at North Road, New Cross printed interest tables, specialist clerical and medical diaries, calendars, parliamentary registers, ledgers, and logbooks.

Letts' publications became ubiquitous, being used by many of the well-known Victorian writers and diarists who were well acquainted with the product range. For example, writing in the Cornhill Magazine, William Makepeace Thackeray noted he preferred a Letts No. 12 diary.

Thomas was joined in the family business by his son, Charles, and together they raised capital for expansion into a limited company in 1870, trading as 'Letts, Son & Co.' However Thomas died soon afterwards, being buried in West Norwood Cemetery in a Grade II listed monument.

The public company lost direction and went into liquidation in 1885. Charles reformed the company privately as Charles Letts & Co., trading profitably for the next century. In 2001, Letts acquired the Filofax Group.
