= Gregorio Dati =

Italian merchant (1362–1435)

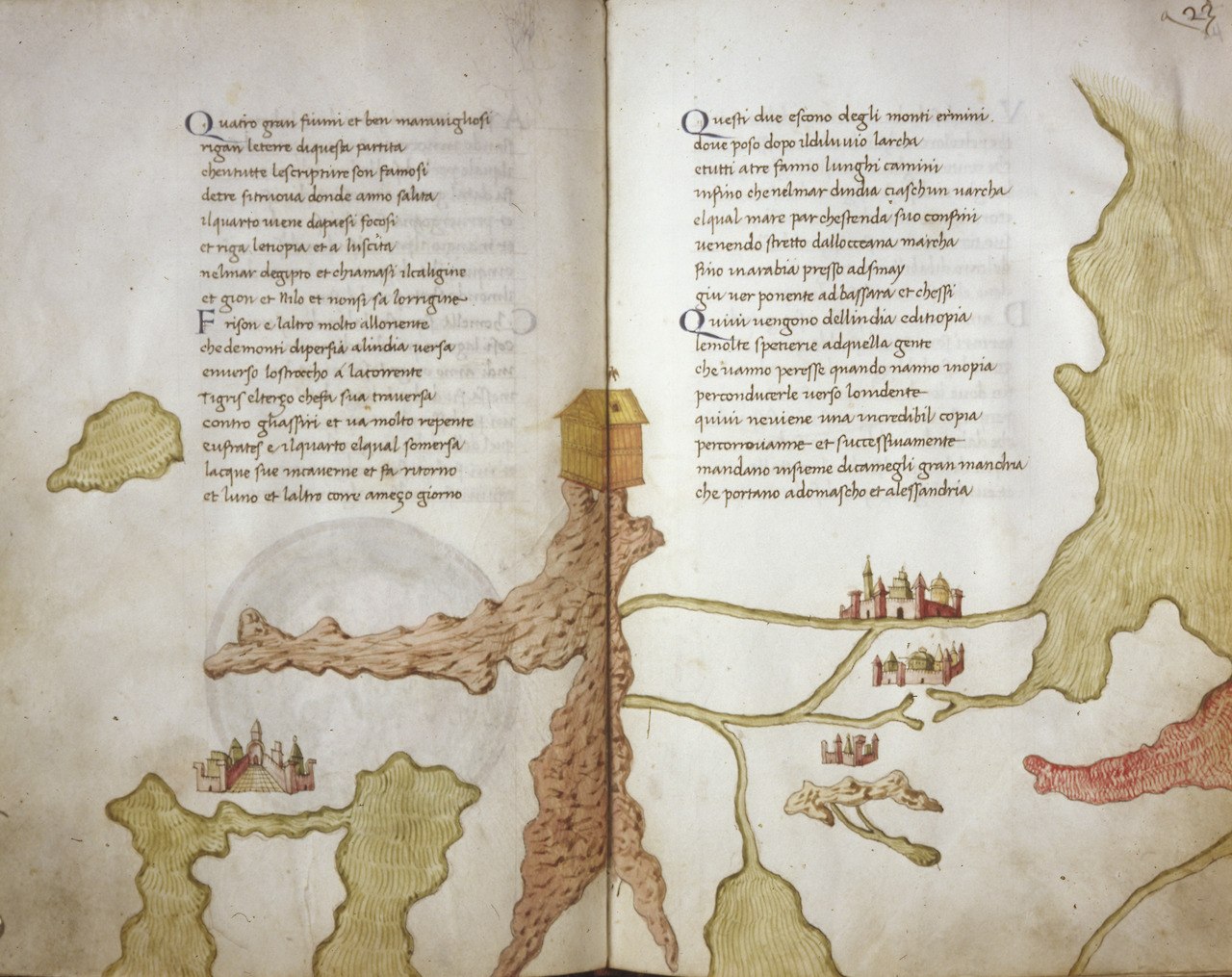
- 15th-century manuscript attributed to Gregorio Dati or his brother Leonardo
- Born: 15 April 1362; Republic of Florence
- Died: 17 September 1435 (aged 73)
- Occupation: Silk merchant
- Known for: 14th-century diary
- Spouse: 4
- Children: 26
- Parents: Stagio Dati (father); Monna Ghita (mother)
- Relatives: Leonardo Dati (brother)

Gregorio (Goro) Dati (15 April 1362 – 17 September 1435) was a Florentine merchant and diarist best known for the authorship of The Diaries of Gregorio Dati, which represents a major source for social and economic historians of Renaissance Florence, alongside the diaries of Buonaccorso Pitti. He kept a detailed diary outlining his business dealings as well as personal information about the births and deaths of his four successive wives and his 26 children.

== Life ==
=== Career ===
Gregorio Dati is perhaps best known for exemplifying the late 14th and early 15th century Florentine silk merchant. Dati was a partner in numerous silk-producing firms over his lifetime, entering the industry when it was still young in Florence. The tumultuous financial situations he describes in his Libro Segreto are testament to risk of the industry. Typical of silk merchants, rather than rely on exporters, Dati's firm sold silks directly in Valencia, a burgeoning Mediterranean trading hub. Complicating his commercial life were piracy, bankruptcy and litigation.

Dati was politically active in Florence, repeatedly serving as consul of the Silk Guild and, later in life, holding a series of public offices. In government, he served as head of the Florentine Signoria and in two bodies of government advisors. He was also overseer of the prestigious Ospedale degli Innocenti and served in the judicial body Ten on Liberty and among the Five Defenders of the County.

Dati's writings have proven useful to historians and scholars alike due to his unique placement within Florentine society. Dati's diary and Libro Segreto represent a major source of information on the economics and social aspects of Florence during this time. His other works include Istoria Di Firenze dal 1380-1405, a chronicle of the Milanese-Florentine wars set in a cautionary tone rather than traditional chronicle, and La Sfera, a manuscript containing astronomical charts and navigational maps. The complexity and thoroughness of his public works demonstrate that he had access to an informal education that involved Classical writers. Dati's writing has been credited as a self-conscious portrayal of Florentine politics, economy and culture.

Dati survived two bouts of bubonic plague that struck his family, and would go on to outlive three of his wives and 19 of his children. Dati did not keep his diary for the last eight years of his life, and he died in 1435.

== Early life ==
Gregorio Dati, also known as Goro, was born April 15, 1362, to silk merchant Stagio Dati (1316–1374) and Monna Ghita (d. 1414) in Florence, Italy. Gregorio had 16 siblings, including Fra Leonardo Dati (1360–1425), a Friar and Master General of the Dominican Order At the age of 13, Gregorio quit school to work in the silk shop of Giovanni di Giano, the beginning of his own career as a silk merchant.

== Personal life ==
=== Marriages and children ===
In his diary, Dati kept an extremely detailed account of the dates surrounding the births and deaths of his four successive wives and his 26 children. With his wives, Dati kept an exact recording of the dowry received and how he invested and spent those florins, handling his personal affairs in the same way he might handle his business affairs. As well as exact dates, Dati kept a record of the godparents of each child and even, in a few cases, what the weather was doing on the day of their births.

Dati's first wife was Bandecca, who died in 1390 following a miscarriage in the fifth month of pregnancy. Consequently, there were no children produced from this union.

After the death of his first wife, Dati travelled to Valencia on an extended trip from 1390 to 1391. During his time in Valencia he fathered an illegitimate child with his Tartar slave, Margherita. He called the child Thomas, but refers to him as Maso in his diary (born December 1391).

In June 1393, Dati married Isabetta (Betta) Villanuzzi after they had been betrothed for several months. According to his diary entry, her dowry of 800 gold florins that came from Betta's first cousins was soon invested in the shop of Buanccorso Berardi, another silk merchant. Dati and Isabetta lived together in Florence, though Dati was often travelling to Catalonia and Valencia on business. Together, they had eight children: Bandecca (1394–1420), Stagio (1396–1400), Veronica (1397–1420), Bernardo (1398–?), Mari (1399–1400), Stagio II (1401), and Piero Antonio (1402). Isabetta died from complications during childbirth in 1402.

Dati married his third wife Ginevra (d. 1419) in 1404 and together they had 11 children before she died from complications during childbirth in 1419. In Gregorio's account of the specifics of each birth, he gives details on only nine. They lived in Florence but moved several times in an attempt to avoid the plague. These children included Manetto (1404–1418), Agnolo (1405), Elisabetta (1406–1414), Antonia (1407–1420), Niccolo (1411), Girolamo (1412–?), Filipo (1415–1419), Ghita (1416–?) and Lisa (1419).

Dati then went on to marry his fourth wife Caterina, daughter of Dardando di Niccolo Guicciardini and Monna Tita. They were married in March 1421, Dati at the age of 59 and Caterina, age 30. Dati recorded that he received a dowry of 600 florins from Caterina's uncle Niccolo d’Andrea. Caterina gave birth to six children including Ginevra (1422–1431), Antonio (1424–?), Lionardo (1425–1431), Anna (1426–?), Fillipa (1427–1430) and Bartolomea (1431–?).

Dati's family would suffer from the bubonic plague twice, once in 1400 and once in 1420. In 1400, two of Dati's children, Stagio and Mari succumbed to the disease. Following that tragedy, the Dati family moved houses several times in an attempt to avoid the plague until they were infected again in 1420, this time losing several servants and three children, Veronica, Bandecca and Antonia, on the same day. According to Cohn and Alfani, one quarter of all plague deaths in Italy occurred within households on the same day, so this phenomenon was not uncommon. In total, Dati fathered 26 children, seven of whom were surviving at the conclusion of his diary. Five children succumbed to plague; several died from other early childhood ailments such as being born prematurely, dysentery and the common cold.

=== Relationship with brother ===
Dati's younger brother Fra Leonardo Dati (1365−1425) was a Dominican Friar and Master General of the Dominican Order during the Great Schism. They seemed to be close; Leonardo was godfather to several of Dati's children, and Dati made a point of mentioning his brother's achievements in his diary entries. This suggests closeness between the two, as Dati never mentions any of his 15 other siblings in his writings. The two men are both associated with the authorship of the cosmographical poem La Sfera.

=== Death ===
Dati did not keep a diary for the last eight years of his life, and he died on September 17, 1435, from an unknown cause.

== Commercial life ==
Gregorio Dati is best known for his career as a silk merchant, which he documents in his Libro Segreto. His mercantile life is typical of what we know about the Florentine silk trade at the time. His father worked in the wool guild and Dati followed in his footsteps for a stint in his youth, but in the late 14th and early 15th centuries the wool industry in Florence went into a slump, perhaps encouraging Dati to take a different path. He may also have been enticed by the greater potential for profit in the silk industry. Dati apprenticed in a silk producing shop in 1375 at 13 years old, when it was still a fairly new industry in Florence.

He was first made partner in 1385 and later formed a number of partnerships throughout his career. Dati's partnerships often lasted less than three years (which was shorter than the average of three to five) and were usually composed of himself and two-three other investors (which was typical). He frequently entered into partnerships with Buonaccorso Beradri from 1387–1394 and Michele di Ser Perente from 1395–1403. The exact terms of the contracts, including how long they would last, who was involved, their initial investments and their corresponding share of the profits were decided and recorded in a ledger—Dati records such contracts in his Libro Segreto. Dati was usually a minor partner in these contracts with a smaller stake in the company, but in 1403, at 41 years old, he tells of a partnership in which the company bears his name, indicating he was the major partner.

While the silk industry had greater potential profitability, it was also riskier. At this time, merchants used the putting-out system, which meant that the silk firm owner, like Dati, would buy raw materials and have them processed by workers (e.g. weavers) for a price set by the guild. Since silk took a long time to make and spent more time on the loom, weavers would require an advance. As a result, initial investment in silk firms needed to be quite high to buy the costly raw silk and give the weavers cash advances, and it could be 3–4 months before the first silks were saleable. Thus we see Dati investing all of his money into companies and often struggling to afford the initial investments. He chose his wives based their dowries; borrowed from banks, friends and his brother Leonardo; and used his own money in order to raise the capital necessary to have a substantial stake in the company and its profits.

Overall, Dati was a successful merchant. According to the 1427 catasto (Florence's tax survey), Dati's total wealth—including private investments, e.g. cash and silk; real estate; and public debt investment—at 64 years old was 3,368 florins. This made him within the wealthiest 10% of Florentines on record.

Silks were a far less standardized finished product than wool; rather, they were personalized by the merchant in the production process. Goldthwaite notes that silk merchants would often try to sell their customized fineries to princes and other nobility, which is attested to by Dati's diaries. Dati's brother and business associate, Simone, attempts to sell silk to the King of Castile, and Dati mentions selling John XXIII, the Pisan pope supported by Florence during the Great Schism, some cloths for 150 Bologna florins.

=== Spanish trade connections ===
Another implication of the high degree of personalization of silk is that the silk producers had a harder time selling to exporters in Florence, who preferred to deal in standardized woolens. As such, silk merchants often tried to sell their product abroad more directly. This is demonstrated by Dati, who seems to have sold a lot of his product in Valencia, a bustling emporium in southern Spain that was well-populated with Florentine merchants and served as an important trading hub for the Mediterranean rim. Dati's brother, Simone di Stagio Dati, lived there for 28 years and was well-positioned to sell Dati's products on consignment, for which Dati paid him a salary of around 60 fl. Dati also personally travelled to Valencia, sometimes for several years at a time. He would often stop to conduct business along the way in Barcelona—the main route to Western Europe—Catalonia, Majorca, and sometimes he travelled further along the Spanish coast to Murcia.

In September 1390, at 28 years old, Dati left for Valencia with his partner Bernardo, arriving on October 26. He laments that this trip would not be expensed by the business and that he did not manage to collect 4000 Barcelona pounds—a considerable sum—from one client, instead returning to Florence in 1392 with a notarized deed.

Shipping goods between Florence and Valencia, while perhaps more profitable, carried with it a certain amount of risk from pirates and inter-state conflict. On September 10, 1393, while returning to Valencia (perhaps in another effort to collect the outstanding debt—he mentions he wants to "finish up business") he was robbed by a Neapolitan galley and taken prisoner to Naples. He was released after being ransomed and managed to retrieve some of his goods with difficulty, but the episode was costly—Dati lost 250 fl worth of pearls, merchandise and his own clothes and 300 fl of company property. He made it back to Florence on December 14.

On April 20, 1394, Dati tried for Valencia again and was successful, staying for about 8 months and returning January 24, 1395. However, later in 1395, his brother Simone was captured by the Neapolitan King Louis of Anjou. He was taken to Gaeta, near Naples, and Dati's firm had to ransom him for 200 fl through Doffo Spini of the Compagnacci, a Florentine political group.

Dati left for Spain again on November 11, 1408, and set out for Florence in May 1410. However, a war between the Florentines and the combined forces of the Genoese and Neapolitans under the aggressive expansionist King Ladislaus caused him to delay in Valencia. He finally returned to Florence in March 1411, but the delay, robberies and kidnappings speak to the volatile environment 15th century merchants operated in due to tensions between the northern Italian city-states.

=== Litigation ===
While in a partnership with Pietro Lana, he was sued twice in the Merchant's Court or Mercanzia. Dati left for Spain without repaying Antonio di Ser Bartolomeo, who then took action against Lana while Dati was away. Dati reports that Lana did a poor job of defending them and focused only on exonerating himself. Significantly, Dati notes the Lana did not even try to use their account books to defend them. It is evident that the use of account books was standard practice in the thousands of surviving Mercanzia documents today, and Lana's failure to do so left Dati bitter. Dati and Lana lost and were fined 2000 silver fl.

Lana then took Dati to the Mercanzia upon Dati's return in 1411, asking the heralds to denounce Dati as bankrupt. Dati had enough money from his trip to Spain to settle accounts and Lana lost his action, but before the dispute could be settled Lana died of plague. Dati settled with Lana's heirs.

== Political life ==
Dati served frequently as guild consul of the Arte di Por Santa Maria, reporting that in May 1423 he was chosen for the 8th time. The Arte di Por Santa Maria was a conglomerate guild that originally governed Florence's retail cloth merchants, silk manufacturers, and small artisans like tailors. The guild set out regulations, product quality standards and industry definitions used in the silk trade, officially distinguishing in 1404, for instance, between the setaioli, the silk manufacturers like Dati, and the setaioli a minuto, who crafted small silk items like ribbons. Toward the end of Dati's life, the Florentine silk trade had become prominent enough that the Arte di Por Santa Maria was often referred to simply as the Arte della Seta—the Silk Guild. The guild consul took part in government and helped protect the guild through legislation—for instance, in 1408 Florence taxed the export of silkworms and mulberry leaves (vital to silkworm husbandry).

Later in life, from 1405 onwards, Dati began to be selected to participate in Florentine communal government. Unlike, for instance, its neighbours to the south in Naples, Florence operated a communal government, in which guild members in good financial standing were selected by draw and served short terms in government offices.

The Signoria was the most powerful body of government, drawing up and ratifying legislation. The most prestigious position in the Signoria and the head of government was the Standard Bearer of Justice, which Dati held for a standard two-month term from March 1, 1429. Also in the Signoria and working alongside the Standard Bearer of Justice was a council of eight Priors, who voted on and decided important legislation—Dati held a position as one in 1421.

Dati also reports serving on the two advisory councils which worked closely with the Signoria, advocating for their parts of the city and voting on important issues. In 1412 and again in 1430, he was chosen as one of the Sixteen Standard Bearers of the Militia, which represented each of Florence's sixteen electoral districts (Dati lived in the district of Ferza). In 1421 he served as one of the Twelve Good Men, which in groups of three represented each of the city's quarters—Dati represented his quarter, Santo Spirito.

He also served as among the Ten on Liberty in 1405, primarily settling small quarrels between citizens but also handling foreign affairs, and among the Five Defenders of the Contado and District through which he advocated for peasants in his neighborhood.

He also held the position of Overseer of the Ospedale degli Innocenti, a lavish orphanage patronized by the Arte di Por San Maria, Dati's guild.

== Religious life ==
Dati's religious life is well presented in his ledger, which was originally written to keep transaction records of his silk business. Dati begins his book by stating that, "In the name of God, his Mother and all the Saints of Paradise, I shall begin this book wherein I shall set forth an account of our activities so as to have a record of then, and wherein having once more and always invoked in the name of God, I shall record the secret affairs of our company and their progress from year to year."

The Church from the late 14th to early 15th century in Florence was very prominent, following the medieval church architecture. Its frequent processions throughout the streets and its symbols and monuments that were visible everywhere – the street corner crucifix and the Virgin Mary's illuminated portrait, the small, cramped parish church and the grandiose monastic foundation – provided an active and vivid religious atmosphere in the city. With its ubiquity and pervasiveness, the church affected the life of every Florentine substantially. As Gene Brucker argues in his book, Renaissance Florence, the church was so venerable and so deeply enmeshed in the city's history and traditions that it was one of the most conservative forces in Florentine life. Florentines continued to grow in their faith, like Dati, despite death, plague, famine, and war striving to atone for previous sin.

Considering the prevalence of Christianity in Florence, Gregorio Dati would have been baptized at birth, which was the normal initiation process for Christians and the standard for Florence at his time, and continued to grow his faith for his lifetime. Throughout the ledger, Dati admits the provision of God in every aspect of his life, praying and trusting for the fortunes and blessings of God.

Oftentimes, throughout the ledger, Dati praises and appreciates God for his good fortune in business, and he acknowledges God's help and guidance. When he enters a new business partnership with Michele, Dati's debits were exceeding the credits and yet, he writes in his book, "God will grant us His grace as He has always done."

When his first wife, Bandecca died on July 15, 1390, as a result of illness from miscarriage, Dati states in his book that "she peacefully returned her soul to her Creator". Also, for his first child's death, Dati states that, "Our Lord God was pleased to take Himself the fruits which He has lent us, and He took first our most beloved, Stagio, our darling and blessed first-born."

Like the vast majority of Florentines, Dati followed the ritual services and ceremonies in church frequently and fervently. According to the children section on his ledger, Dati states he had one boy with his first wife Bandecca, eight children with the second wife Betta, eleven children with the third wife Ginevra, and overall Dati had a total of twenty children. And of all the children, except for ones who died on miscarriage, Dati states they were all baptized in the love of God on the Sunday after they were born.

== Writings ==
=== Diary ===
Dati, like other merchants of his time such as Buonaccorso Pitti, kept a diary as a proof of accounts. The commonly used version of Dati's diary is translated by Julia Martines, from a printed text edited by Carlo Gargiolli and published in Bologna in 1865, however, Gargiolli makes no comment on which manuscript he used. Dati's diary has several sections, but its purpose was to record his investments, partners, transactions and profits. Dati includes information about his genealogy and heritage, which provided him credibility. The diaries represent contracts, ledgers, familial history, and consequently recorded members of households that would otherwise not be known. Everything known about Dati's personal life has been extrapolated from his diary.

Dati's diary reveals social trends in Florence during the fifteenth century. Dati continually praised God for his success and failure, his wives' deaths, his children's births and his political career. When his eldest son Stagio (1396–1400) died, Dati prays that Stagio will intercede on his behalf to God and the Virgin Mary. All subsequent deaths of his children have the same wish. This was part of a popular movement that entreated all innocents to pray and that asked deceased children to intercede on their parents’ behalf.

Dati's diary contains accounts, memorandums, and partnerships. The details within each section pertain to how many florins each partner invested, locations of investment, notably Valencia, and the outcome of each venture. Dati admits several times that without monetary aid from his brother, and god's favour, several of his business ventures would have collapsed, possibly due to not having large amounts of liquid assets on hand as they were always invested.

Dati's diary is an example of a Florentine trader who struggled in making a successful business and had a marginally more prominent civic career. He was meticulous in record keeping, demonstrated in recording each of his wives’ personal accounts and when he and new partners invested in shares. Dati recorded daily life and proceedings, providing historians with an alternative perspective on Florentine politics and culture compared to other Florentine diarists and writers.

=== Libro Segreto ===
Dati's Libro Segreto was started later in his life, around 1404, in attempts to atone for what he felt as his first forty years of sin. This book is much more private than his diary and was referenced as a "…secret ledger…to keep our [his] partnerships affairs." It was edited by Carlo Gargiolli in 1869.

Dati recorded in vernacular Italian household accounts, private business that he conducted himself and records of penance. Dati also confesses financial disasters that result in him closing companies or losing shares. Self-prescribed penance includes not going to work on feast day, allowing people to work for him those days and striving to keep Friday nights chaste. Failure to do so would lead to paying 5-20 solidus to "God’s poor," distributing alms, and doing 20 Hail Mary's, depending on the severity of the pledge broken. During Dati's civic career, he pledged never to put forth his own name or lobby for more offices other than the ones he has been deemed fit by others to occupy. Dati also refused to occupy an office that would result in passing the death penalty on someone: his writings relating to family suggest that he struggled with death as it affected him heavily. Dati followed more conservative teachings of the church, believing that one must suffer body and soul to be saved, which are reflected in his writing.

Libro Segreto was created for recording transactions of partnerships separately for protection. Antonio di Segna caused Dati to review all assets when he was discovered taking more than his share, verified by Libro Segreto. Dati's private worries about being on his own in business for eight months with a chance of breaking even are revealed. He admits to being near bankruptcy several times, relying on friends and his brother to procure the funds, admitting to paying off a creditor hours before being elected standard bearer for his company. The final section of his Libro Segreto is of the horrendous partnership with Peitro Lana in 1408.

The reality of daily life recorded by Dati reflects an unstable political environment; people were caught between agreeing with the papacy or the Commune of Florence itself regarding supremacy and obedience. Dati's secret book reflects his ability to discern right and wrong through his criticisms of partners and government.

=== Istoria Di Firenze dal 1380–1405 ===
Dati is believed to have started the Istoria around 1409, after the events it describes, and is considered a reflective history rather than a chronicle. Hans Baron argued in 1955 that it was composed in 1407–1408, making it likely that Dati wrote it abroad.

Dati provides a coherent representation of Florence that almost spans his life and focuses on Gian Galeazzo Visconti, Duke of Milan, and his attempted conquest of Florence. The focus on the Milanese-Florentine war unified his work, allowing him to write Istoria for future guidance, not relying overmuch on morality or historical examples like previous chroniclers. The "anonymous chronicle" of Florence wrote of the same events while they were happening, including them in a larger chronicle without much political or economic context, consequently depriving himself the opportunity to record the effects of the decisions made. Dati was of a younger generation, writing after the attempted conquest, offering a simplified, single-focus chronicle.

Dati's delivery of political and economic undercurrents in Istoria is similar to how history is taught today, through relation of undercurrents and how they affect action. The humanist movement at this time is not reflected in Dati's writing style, instead maintaining scholastic style: more organic and analytical of underlying political themes, resembling medieval historians’ styles in writing.

Dati uses "fortune" as a participatory force when describing the conquest. Dati argued fortune was predictable, acting in response to action and reaction by people and events. This allowed Dati to attribute an active force of human agency and that punishment would be akin to moral consequences, not divine intervention. He states that it was the Duke's impatience that caused his downfall because fortune ceased to favour him due to immoral actions. Fortune could be deduced directly from political action and reaction, it was not a wheel as described by Villani or would be by Machiavelli. Fortune was actively manifested and personified in human action and reaction: the rise and fall of the Duke was because he could not see that his greed was a temptress, luring him. Dati believes that the Duke's blindness was due to his obsession with obtaining Florence. Failure was due to the Duke's character, not Divine intervention; a regressive understanding of events at this point in time. The description of fortune by Dati shifted beliefs that outcomes were fated by God. Instead, Dati views outcomes as fated due to the predictability of fortune but he attributes human passion as the motivating agent causing the rise and fall action of fortune.

Dati engendered civic pride when discussing past events and the mood of the people when confronted with an oligarchical power, believing that the government of the Commune was superior to that of Milan and fell into agreement with the papacy. Dati saw the Guelphs representing liberty against the Roman Republic tradition of uniformity. The community of Florence had strong foundations to remain constant in their values during upheaval. Dati admitted that while the church provided stability to guide people, it was the quality of religious beliefs, not quantity, that should be favoured. This attitude allowed Dati to examine several perspectives that shared similar underlying opinions with little bias. Finally, Dati's Istoria succeeded his contemporaries because he removed divine intervention as the central agent, replacing it with human nature.

=== La Sfera ===
La Sfera is a composition of four books pertaining to the introduction of basic uses of geography, astrology and cosmology. Filiberto Segatto determined that La Sfera was written between the early fifteenth century and Dati's death in 1435 because there is a 1403 codex in the library of the University of Pavia. However, it is argued that it may have been written and unfinished at the time of Dati's death due to later copies adding more. Tolosani's 1514 copy included portions of Eastern Europe and Africa and marginal notes, currently in the Library of Laurenziana. There is a mid-fifteenth century copy at the University of Kansas, Kenneth Spencer Research Library. The manuscript previously belonged to Sir Thomas Phillipps, a nineteenth-century manuscript collector. There is a 1475 copy from Venice, published by Gabriele di Pietro, in the Library of Congress.

According to a study by Bertolini, of the 148 manuscripts examined, only 25 name Dati as sole contributor while 6 claim Dati and Fra Leonardo Dati as authors. Leonardo is considered Dati's only contact of philosophical thinking. Leonardo had the benefit of education within the church, but Gregorio, who left his education around the age of thirteen, demonstrates he had informal education or access that continued. A 1514 manuscript by Tolosani (the same as above), a Dominican belonging to the same monastery as Leonardo, claims that Dati was the author of La Sfera.

Book I contains elements of cosmology and astrology, Book II contains information on weather, tides and seasons, Book III contains details on wind, compassing, time keeping and nautical charts, and Book IV is an itinerary of important ports in the South and Eastern Mediterranean. The variety of topics discussed in the manuscript reflects interests Florentine merchants had in trade and commerce. The exclusion of the rest of the Mediterranean ports despite other sources documenting Florentine trading suggests that the manuscript was incomplete, possibly due to Gregorio's death in 1435.

La Sfera was written in ottava rima, a construction of stanzas of eight. As such, La Sfera is considered an important early Italian source for vernacular writing pertaining to geography, called "geografi metriche". The work would have been useful for ascertaining rough distances between ports of call and possible weather patterns but the maps and charts are inaccurate, even by contemporary standards, which were also inaccurate. This suggests La Sfera was not intended as a manual but represented an encyclopedic compilation of knowledge regarding trade and navigational tools. The content of this manuscript suggests a foreign audience of middle class merchants.

== Bibliography ==
- Alfani, G., and S. Cohn. "Households and Plague in Early Modern Italy." Journal of Interdisciplinary History Vol. 38, no. 2 (2007): 45-69.
- Branca, Vittore, (Ed.) and Murtha Baca, (Trans). Merchant Writers of the Italian Renaissance: Boccaccio to Machiavelli. New York: Marsilio Publishers (1999).
- Bruker, Gene. The Civic World of Early Renaissance Florence. Princeton: Princeton UP, 1977.
- Brucker, Gene. Renaissance Florence. New York: John Wiley & Sons (1969).
- Brucker, Gene (Ed.), and Julian Martines (Trans). Two Memoirs of Renaissance Florence: The Diaries of Buannaccorse Pitti and Gregorio Dati. New York: Harper and Row (1967).
- Cook, Karen Severud. "Dati's Sfera: The Manuscript Copy in the Kenneth Spencer Research Library, University of Kansas". Mediterranean Studies. Vol. 11 (2002): 45-69.
- Crum, Roger J., and John T. Paoletti, (Eds.). Renaissance Florence: A Social History. New York: Cambridge University Press (2006).
- Dati, Gregorio, and Leonardo Dati. La Sfera. Washington D.C.: Library of Congress, Rare Book and Special Collections Division. PQ4621.D17 S4 1475. Accessed May 24, 2021. https://lccn.loc.gov/70277411.
- Clemens, Raymond. "Medieval Maps in Renaissance Context: Gregorio Dati and the Teaching of Geography in Fifteenth-Century Florence," in Richard J.A. Talbert and Richard W. Unger (eds), Cartography in Antiquity and the Middle Ages: Fresh Perspectives, New Methods (Leiden: Brill, 2008) (Technology and Change in History, 10).
- Epurescu-Pascovici, Ionut. "Gregorio Dati (1362-1435) and the Limits of Individual Agency". Medieval History Journal Vol. 19, no. 2 (2006): 297-325.
- Golthwaite, Richard A. The Economy of Renaissance Florence. Baltimore: Johns Hopkins University Press (2009).
- Green, Louis. Chronicle into History: An Essay on the Interpretation of History in Florentine Fourteenth-Century Chronicles. Cambridge: Cambridge University Press (1972).
- Martines, Lauro. Scourge and Fire: Savonarola and Renaissance Florence. London: Jonathan Cape (2006).
- Najemy, John M. A History of Florence: 1200-1575. Malden: Blackwell (2006).
- Online Catasto of 1427. Version 1.3. Edited by David Herlihy, Christiane Klapisch-Zuber, R. Burr Litchfield and Anthony Molho. [Machine readable data file based on D. Herlihy and C. Klapisch-Zuber, Census and Property Survey of Florentine Domains in the Province of Tuscany, 1427-1480.] Florentine Renaissance Resources/STG: Brown University, Providence, R.I., 2002.
