= Daily Journal =

Daily Journal may refer to:

- Daily Journal (Franklin, Indiana), a newspaper published in Johnson County, Indiana, United States
- Daily Journal (Illinois), a newspaper published in Kankakee, Illinois, United States
- Daily Journal (Missouri), a newspaper published in Park Hills, Missouri, United States
- The Daily Journal (New Jersey), a newspaper published in Vineland, New Jersey, United States
- The Daily Journal (Venezuela), an English language newspaper in Caracas, Venezuela
- Daily Journal of Commerce, a newspaper published in Portland, Oregon, United States
- The Daily Journal (Fergus Falls), a newspaper published in Fergus Falls, Minnesota, United States
- Los Angeles Daily Journal, a daily legal newspaper published in Los Angeles, California
- Marietta Daily Journal, a daily newspaper published in Marietta, Georgia
- Northeast Mississippi Daily Journal
- San Francisco Daily Journal – San Francisco Legal News, a daily legal newspaper published in San Francisco, California
- San Mateo Daily Journal, a daily newspaper distributed throughout San Mateo County, California
- Seattle Daily Journal of Commerce, a daily newspaper published in Seattle, Washington

== See also ==
- Daily Journal Corporation, an American publishing company, headquartered in Los Angeles
- List of journals (disambiguation)
