= Journal News =

The Journal News may refer to the following United States newspapers:

- Journal-News, a daily newspaper in Butler County, Ohio
  - Hamilton JournalNews, a former daily newspaper in Hamilton, Ohio, that merged into Journal-News of Butler County
- The Journal News, a daily newspaper in the Lower Hudson Valley of New York State
- The Journal-News (Hillsboro, Illinois)

== See also ==
- News Journal (disambiguation)
- The Journal (disambiguation)
