= Lefax =

Personal organizer company

- Company type: Personal organizers
- Founded: 1910
- Founder: J. C. Parker
- Defunct: 1992
- Fate: Bought by Filofax, used as a brand for several years, then phased out.
- Successor: Filofax
- Headquarters: Philadelphia, PA, United States
- Products: Personal organizers

Lefax was a company founded in 1910 by J. C. Parker in Philadelphia that produced a range of personal organizers. In its early days, the biggest customers were power plant engineers whose technical handbooks had grown too big to carry.

In 1921, a London printer and stationery marketer, Norman & Hill Ltd., began importing the organizers, called Lefaxes. Several years later, they began to make the personal files under their Filofax brand.

The Lefax trademark was registered 5 October 1926. Its use in the engineering industries was so pervasive that some journals were published in Lefax format.

In the 1980s Lefax was bought out by London Wood Partners, a British firm, and in 1992 the company was acquired by its rival, Filofax. The original intention was that Lefax would be Filofax's top-of-the-line range but the Lefax brand was eventually phased out.
