= Richard I. Winwood =

American businessman (born 1943)

Richard Ivan Winwood
- Born: January 18, 1943 (age 83)
- Education: Portland State University, Southern Virginia University
- Occupations: Owner of Million Air LLC, Director at BioMeridian Inc
- Known for: Developer of the Franklin Day Planner
- Spouse: Judith Anette Winwood (Rigas)
- Parent(s): Robert Ivan and Edna Enz Winwood

Richard Ivan Winwood (born January 18, 1943) is an author, religious leader, and business executive with Franklin-Covey.

== Biographical background ==
Winwood was born in Portland, Oregon, to Robert Ivan Winwood and Edna Pauline Enz. He attended Portland State University and Seattle City University.

Winwood was raised as a Protestant, though skeptical of organized religions. He was given a copy of the Book of Mormon when he was around twenty-five and a married father of two. This led to his conversion and 1971 baptism into the Church of Jesus Christ of Latter-day Saints (LDS Church) in Portland, Oregon. Shortly afterward, his new faith was shaken by the anti-Mormon book Who Really Wrote the Book of Mormon?. This led to his investigation of anti-Mormonism and involvement in Mormon apologetics. In the 1990s he published a book and video defending the LDS Church against critics.

Winwood is married to Judith Annette Rigas and they have four children. They currently reside in Cottonwood Heights, Utah.

== Business ==
Winwood was a founding executive and Chief Operating Officer of Franklin-Covey (formerly Franklin Quest and Franklin International Institute), which has published some of his books. He was the principal designer of the first Franklin Day-Planner, which earned him tens of millions of dollars. He is author of the original Franklin Time Management Seminar.

Winwood has been chairman of BioMeridian International Inc (formerly Magellan Technology), a non-invasive medical screening device manufacturing company in Draper, Utah,

Winwood turned to the aviation industry in 1994.

He was Chairman of Keystone Aviation LC (dba Million Air Salt Lake City/Provo), an aircraft services company.

He also founded WinAir Airlines in 1997, and Million Air LLC in 2001, and is the current owner of Intermountain Air.

== Religious service ==
For the LDS Church, Winwood has served as Mission President of the Canada Halifax Mission from 1991–94, Visitor Center Director and Mission President of the Salt Lake Temple Square Mission from 1999–2001, and President of the England Missionary Training Centre in Preston from 2005–07.

== Published work ==
Winwood has authored books on business and personal management, including Time Management: An Introduction to the Franklin System, Creating Quality Meetings: Latest Techniques for Mastering Group Communication, and Time Effective Meetings. He also authored Take Heed That Ye Be Not Deceived, a work in defense of Mormonism.

In Commodify Your Dissent: Salvos from The Baffler, Thomas Frank satirises Time Management as a book that fuses the "self-help, business and inspirational genres," to acclaim time management and self-esteem as the path to "personal fulfillment and skyrocketing profits," pursuing, in Frank's opinion, an ideal of "exquisite mediocrity."
