= Bujo =

Bujo may refer to:

- A type of fortune telling fraud
- Bullet Journal, a personal organization system
