= Day-Timer =

American manufacturer

- Logo as of 2022
- Founded: 1951
- Founder: Morris Perkin
- Headquarters: East Texas, Pennsylvania, U.S.
- Products: personal organizer products
- Website: daytimer.com

Day-Timer is an American manufacturer of personal organizers and other paper-based time management and organizational tools. The company was founded in 1951 in Allentown, Pennsylvania, and relocated to neighboring East Texas, Pennsylvania, in the 1960s as its sales and product popularity grew.

In the early 21st century, however, the company suffered from emerging competition from electronic devices with similar functionality. In 2012, it decentralized its offices across several states while continuing to publish its paper-based products.

== History ==
=== 20th century ===
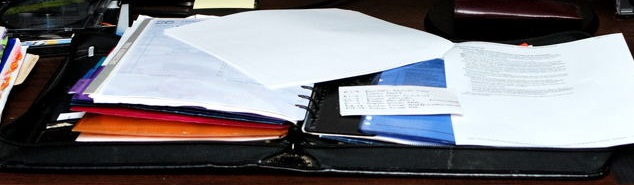
A Day-Timer planner on an office desk in 2008

The Day-Timer product began with Morris Perkin, an attorney for the Allentown, Pennsylvania, law firm of Perkin, Twining & Christie. The idea of what Perkin called Lawyer's Day was that it provided two loose-leaf pages that combined five different types of record keeping into one place: a record of what time was spent with which client on what work, an appointment book for meetings and events, a reminder or "tickler" of things that needed to be done each day, a daily/weekly/monthly plan of work to be done, and a permanent record of work activities. Initially Perkin made Lawyer's Day just for himself, but colleagues in the firm saw its advantages and wanted it for themselves.

Starting in 1951, Perkin offered the Lawyer's Day product for mail order from an address in Allentown. He used an Allentown printer for that but things did not work out. It was later published by Fallon Press in New York City, but that collaboration also ultimately failed.

In 1956, Dorney Printing was granted the job of producing the Day-Timer product. Located in East Texas, Pennsylvania in Lower Macungie Township, Dorney Printing had been around since at least 1940. The company was then run by the three Dorney brothers, in partnership with their mother, in a business that the brothers once labored on in a converted chicken coop with their late father. The family operation was known for printing calendars for local churches, and advertising products, school yearbooks, and other marketing and publication materials.

Another product, Accountant's Day, was formed for that occupation. In 1959, Accountant's Day was assigned the generic name "Day-Timer" and began to grow sales in the financial, advertising, and architectural worlds. This acceptance by professionals continued into the 1960s.

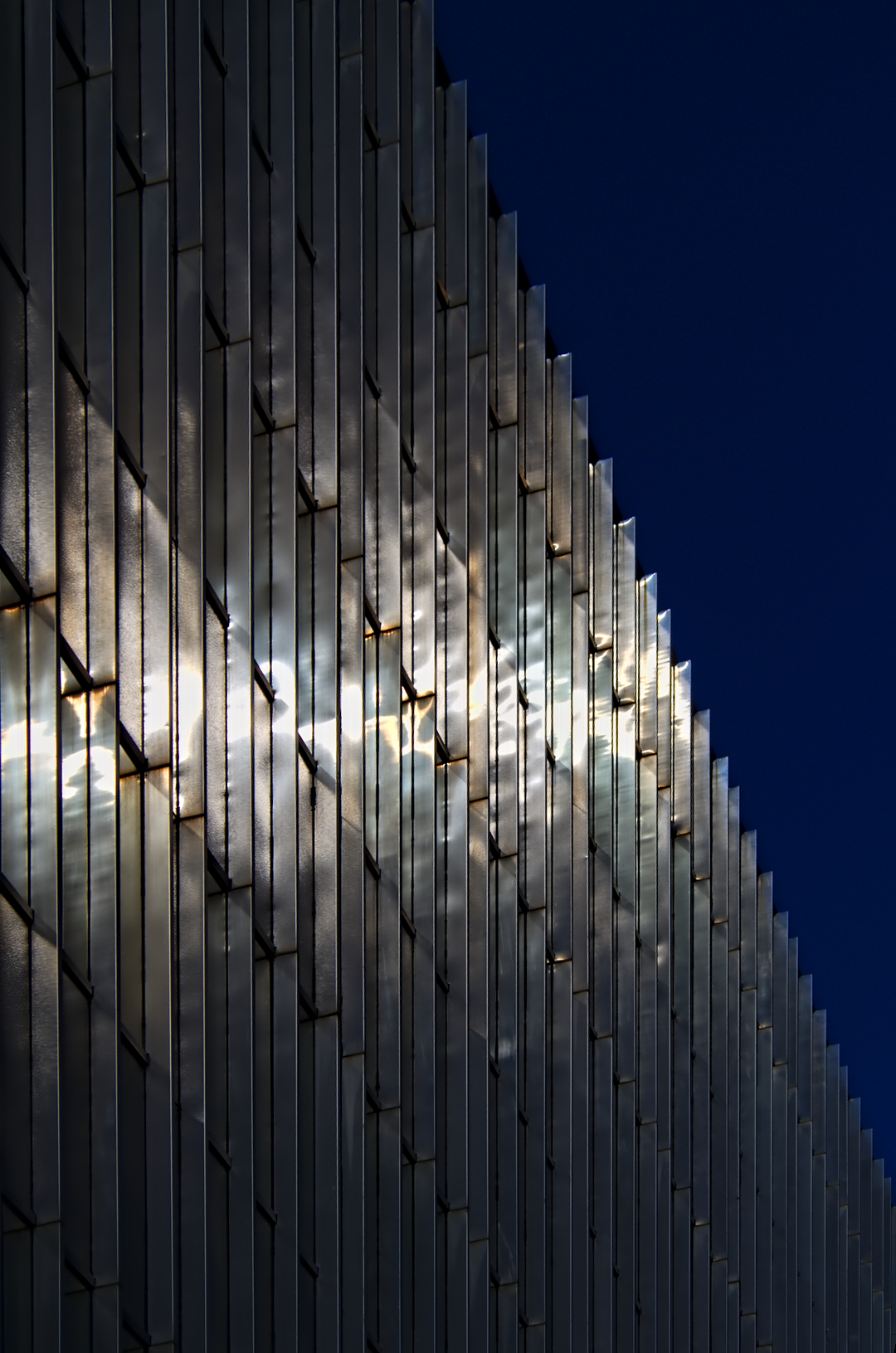
The building that formerly housed Day-Timer's Canada headquarters in St. Catharines, Ontario

In 1963, Perkin's company was rebranded as Day-Timers, Inc. The product was offered in various sizes ranging from full letter-paper size down to small pocket-sized versions. A subsidiary, Day-Timers Canada, Ltd., was created and also performed well.

Day-Timers product was initially considered a filler job for the family. Once its sales began accelerating, however, it began representing the lion's share of the company's publications and the company developed a sizable production facility in East Texas, Pennsylvania to accommodate the growth. The collaboration between Perkin and the Dorneys was going well, and Perkin decided to buy Dorney Printing and make it a subsidiary.

Perkin was president of Day-Timers, Inc. and brother Robert Dorney, who had coordinated the printing work with Perkin, was the company's vice president and general manager. By the end of the 1960s, Day-Timers, Inc. had 300,000 customers and 125 employees. Most sales were coming via direct mail.

In 1972, the company was acquired by Beatrice Foods, which kept a hands-off approach. Four years later, in 1976, Perkin died, and Dorney became the company's president.

In the mid-1980s, Day-Timer was manufacturing and selling containers for storage of prior years' books. The company also identified a large market for paper datebooks that a few companies were still publishing, and the company's product remained highly popular among professionals. Filofax was one of Day-Timer's largest competitors during this time.

In 1986, Day-Timer had some $100 million in sales and about 3 million customers, predominantly including corporate executives and professionals.

The Day-Timer product sold particularly well among its original customer base of attorneys; the company estimated in 1987 that a fifth of all practicing attorneys in the United States were using one, and the company was employing approximately 800 full-time employees at its East Texas, Pennsylvania facility during this time. By 1987, the product was selling successfully even during economic downturns since demand for tools that could provide greater managerial efficiency was largely not impacted.

By the late 1980s, Day-Timer was publishing a variety of desk diaries, organizers, and pocket calendars. The main Day-Timer product has a page for each day, with spaces for annotating various kinds of activities; there is also a pull-out calendar which can provide a view of the year as a whole. The product also has calendar inserts that can be changed on a regular basis.

In 1988, American Brands acquired Day-Timer and made it part of what would become ACCO Brands.

The company's East Texas, Pennsylvania factory facility also emerged as a popular destination for Day-Timer customers. In 1985, one enthusiastic Day-Timer customer said, "Only compulsives can do this system. But there are a lot of us out there." Several notable public figures who enthusiastically used Day-Timers included Dwight Eisenhower, Bob Hope, and Lorne Greene.

In the mid-late-1990s, the company had a successful PC product in the PIM space, called Day-Timer Organizer. Following Day-Timer's acquisition of Chronologic Corporation and their program Install Recall, the reworked and rebranded Day-Timer Organizer for Windows was released in 1994. One review of the new product said it kept a "zealous dedication to the hard-copy Day-Timer metaphor."

=== 21st century ===
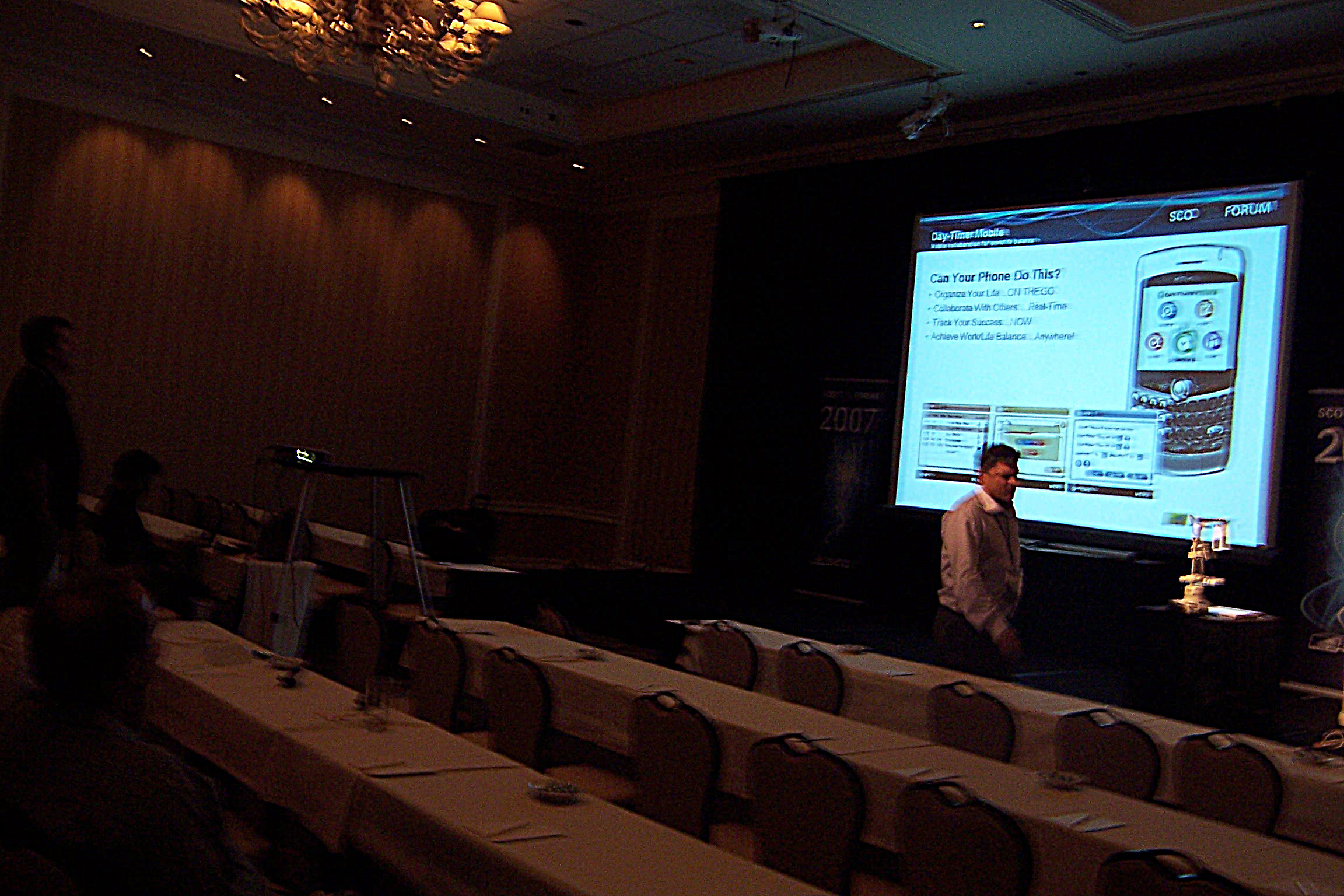
Preparation for an SCO Group presentation on the ill-fated DT4 mobile app in 2007

By 2000, Day-Timer Organizer had gone through several versions, and the product was well-received, twice winning "Editor's Choice" awards from PC Magazine. Later versions, such Day-Timer Organizer 2000, still kept their resemblance to the Day-Timer paper product. The Day-Timer Organizer product competed with Lotus Organizer.

Datebooks and personal organizers tended to inspire loyalty to particular brands; in July 2006, The Morning Call, an Allentown-based newspaper reported, "Some people cannot live without their Day-Timer Day Planners."

Day-Timer's initial paper products co-existed with the advent of personal computers. The popularity of Day-Timer was of the level that early PC personal information manager (PIM) applications such as Borland Sidekick could print out appointment pages in Day-Timer format, for physical insertion into a Day-Timer book. Early on there was a collaboration with Lotus 1-2-3 that did not work out.

With the emergence of smartphones, the company began exploring mobile software options for its product. In 2006, the company entered into an agreement with The SCO Group, which agreed to build a mobile app named DT4 for the BlackBerry and other mobile app devices. While work on it began, the collaboration between the two companies did not last.

In 2009, Day-Timer introduced a calendaring app for the iPhone.

In 2012, the company introduced Plan2Go, a replacement app for Android phones supported as a platform in addition to the iPhone.

In early 2014, the company decided to discontinue the app and ceased offering a software application, marketing its products as purely paper offerings, a position they maintained into the early 2020s.

Paper-based personal organizers continued losing market share to digital versions and electronic devices. Day-Timer struggled during the Great Recession; in 2009, the company reduced employees' pay as opposed to conducting layoffs.

=== Corporate relocation ===
In 2012, ACCO Brands merged with MeadWestvaco, which also had other personal organizer products, including At-A-Glance and Day Runner; to eliminate redundancies, corporate heads decided to shut down Day-Timers' historical Lehigh Valley-based headquarters, leading to the loss of 300 jobs there, and shifted Day-Timer product operations to corporate facilities in New York, Ohio, and Illinois. This was another blow to the Lehigh Valley economy, which had previously undergone major factory closings from Mack Trucks, Ingersoll Rand, and other historically Lehigh Valley-based companies.

The market for paper-based personal organizers and calendars remains, and Day-Timer continue to publish these products.

== See also ==
- FranklinCovey
