= List of newspapers named News Journal =

News Journal is a common name for newspapers:

== Nigeria ==
- The News Journal (Nigeria), weekly newspaper in Western State

== United States ==
- The News Journal is a newspaper in Wilmington, Delaware.
- The Daytona Beach News-Journal, daily newspaper serving Volusia and Flagler counties in Florida
- Pensacola News Journal, daily newspaper serving Escambia and Santa Rosa counties in Florida
- News Journal (Corbin), weekly newspaper serving Knox, Laurel and Whitley counties in Kentucky
- Mansfield News Journal, daily newspaper from Mansfield, Richland County, Ohio, and serving north-central Ohio
- News Journal (Ohio), daily newspaper in Wilmington, Clinton County, Ohio
- Clovis News Journal, daily newspaper based in Clovis, Curry County, New Mexico
- The Daily News Journal, newspaper from Murfreesboro, Rutherford County, Tennessee
- Alice Echo-News Journal, daily newspaper based in Alice, Jim Wells County, Texas
- Longview News-Journal, daily newspaper based in Longview, Gregg County, Texas
- Box Elder News Journal, newspaper in Brigham City, Box Elder County, Utah

== See also ==
- Journal News (disambiguation), several publications
- Stroud News & Journal, a weekly newspaper in Stroud, Gloucestershire, England
