= Hyrum W. Smith =

American executive (1943–2019)

Hyrum W. Smith (October 16, 1943 – November 18, 2019) founded the Franklin Quest Company in 1983. Among the company's other products, Smith created the Franklin Planner and seminars on productivity development based on "principles" and other concepts. In 1997, Franklin Quest merged with Stephen R. Covey's Leadership Center to form Franklin Covey. Smith was the author of 10 Natural Laws of Successful Time and Life Management (1994) and What Matters Most (2001) as well as producing audio tapes.

Smith served as a missionary for the Church of Jesus Christ of Latter-day Saints in England. He then was drafted into the U.S. Army and served in Germany. In 1966 he married Gail Cooper and they became the parents of six children. He graduated with a degree in business administration from Brigham Young University in 1971.

Smith served as a mission president, in the newly-formed California Ventura Mission, for his church beginning in 1978. He also wrote a few religious books: Where Eagles Rest (1982) a collections of sermons he gave over the years, and Pain is Inevitable, Misery is Optional (2004) about his 1998 excommunication from and 2004 rejoining of the LDS Church. After being diagnosed a few months earlier, he died from cancer on November 18, 2019.
