= WinAir Airlines =

American charter airline

| IATA | ICAO | Call sign |
|---|---|---|
| none | WNA | WinAir |
- Founded: 1997; 29 years ago
- Ceased operations: 1999; 27 years ago
- Hubs: Long Beach Municipal Airport
- Fleet size: 10
- Destinations: 5
- Headquarters: Salt Lake City, Utah
- Key people: Richard Winwood
- Website: www.flywinair.com (defunct)

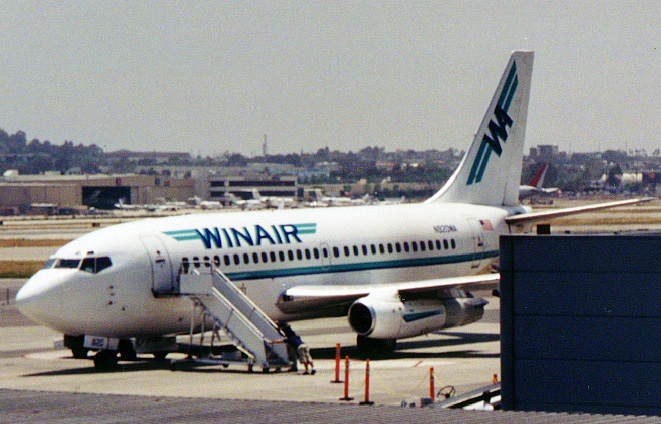
WinAir 737-200 on the ramp in Long Beach

WinAir Airlines was a short-lived charter passenger airline in the United States based in Salt Lake City, Utah, and founded by Richard I. Winwood. Established in 1997, its first flight was a Super Bowl charter on January 25, 1998. This rapid certification was credited partially to experienced staff, which included personnel from Morris Air, Key Airlines, and Champion Air.

In November 1998, the airline launched public scheduled charter flights from a hub at Long Beach Municipal Airport in Long Beach, California, to Las Vegas, Nevada, Oakland, California, Sacramento, California, and Salt Lake City, Utah. The airline applied to the FAA for authority to operate as a scheduled passenger airline, but this was not received by the time the airline shut down.

After running into substantial financial difficulties and maintenance concerns caused by the leaseholders and former aircraft owners including Pegasus Airlines of Turkey and Garuda Indonesia regarding some of the airline's leased 737-400 aircraft, the airline shut down on July 6, 1999.

The airline was featured in the 1999 film For Love of the Game. The film was released in September 1999, two months after the airline ceased operations.

== Destinations ==
- California
  - Long Beach, California (Long Beach Airport)
  - Oakland, California (Oakland International Airport)
  - Sacramento, California (Sacramento International Airport)
- Nevada
  - Las Vegas, Nevada (McCarran International Airport)
- Utah
  - Salt Lake City, Utah (Salt Lake City International Airport)

The airline also planned flights to Seattle, Washington. Seattle was dropped the week before the airline was scheduled to fly, as competition from rival carriers including Southwest Airlines and Delta Air Lines made it impossible to compete without a contract with Boeing to guarantee a minimum number of passengers between Long Beach and Seattle. After failing to finalize a contract in time, WinAir canceled Seattle as a destination.

== Fleet ==
Over the course of its operations, WinAir operated a total of 10 aircraft:

- 5 - Boeing 737-200
- 2 - Boeing 737-300
- 3 - Boeing 737-400

== See also ==
- List of defunct airlines of the United States

== Sources ==
- Norwood, Tom W. (2006). Deregulation Knockouts, Round Two. Sandpoint, Idaho: Airways International. p. 114. OCLC 77065792. ISBN 0-9653993-2-2.
- Olson, Ralph R (September–October 1999). "Winair Airlines: A "Win-Win" for Southern California Travelers". Airliners: The World's Airline Magazine. World Transport Press. pp. 60–63.
