= Leonardo Dati =

Italian friar and humanist

- Master of the Order of Preachers
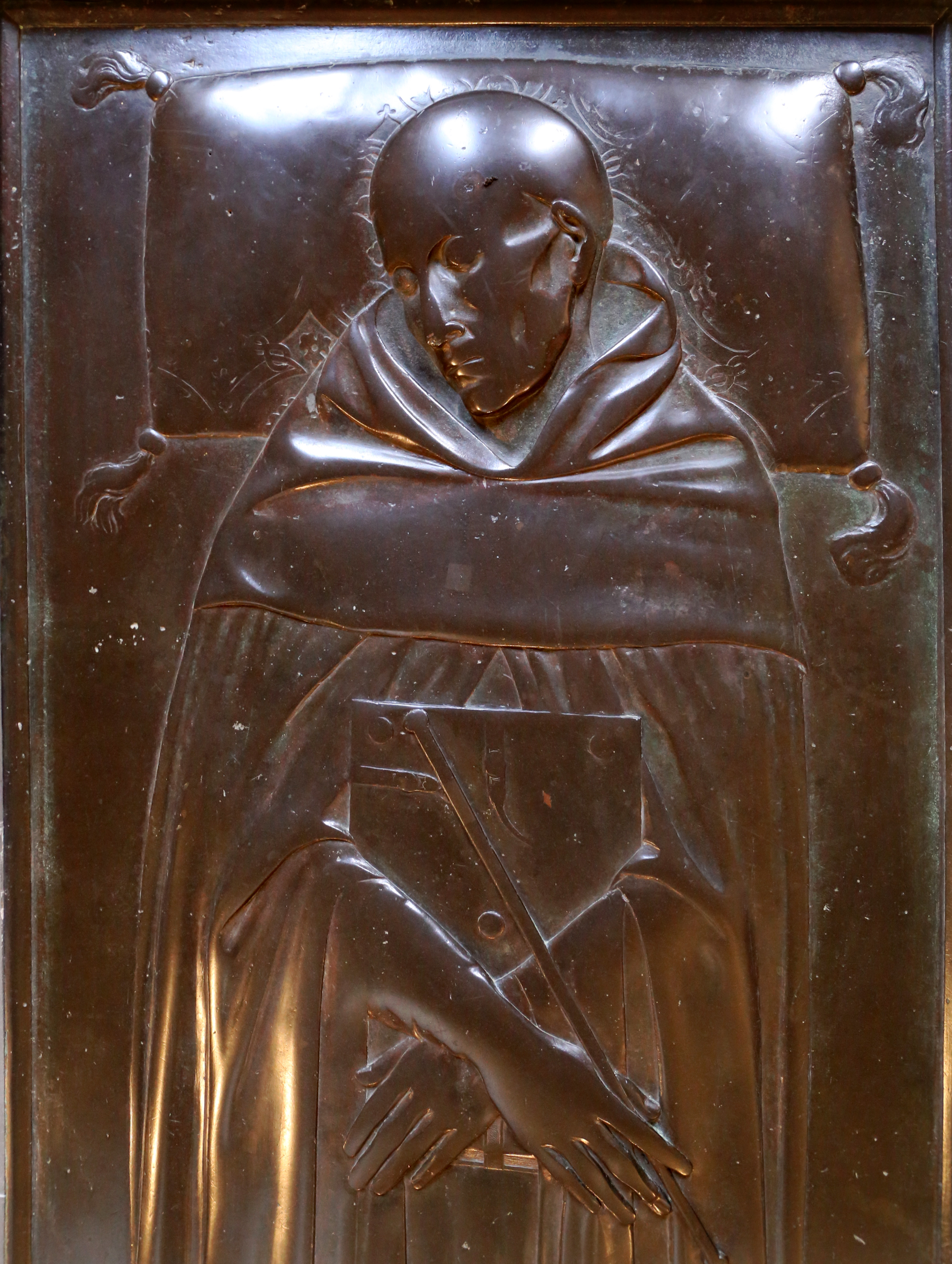
- Effigy of Dati on his tomb in Santa Maria Novella in Florence attributed to Lorenzo Ghiberti

Orders
- Created cardinal: March 16, 1425 by Pope Martin V

Personal details
- Born: 1360 Republic of Florence, Italy
- Died: March 16, 1425 (aged 64–65)
- Denomination: Order of Preachers
- Occupation: Friar and humanist

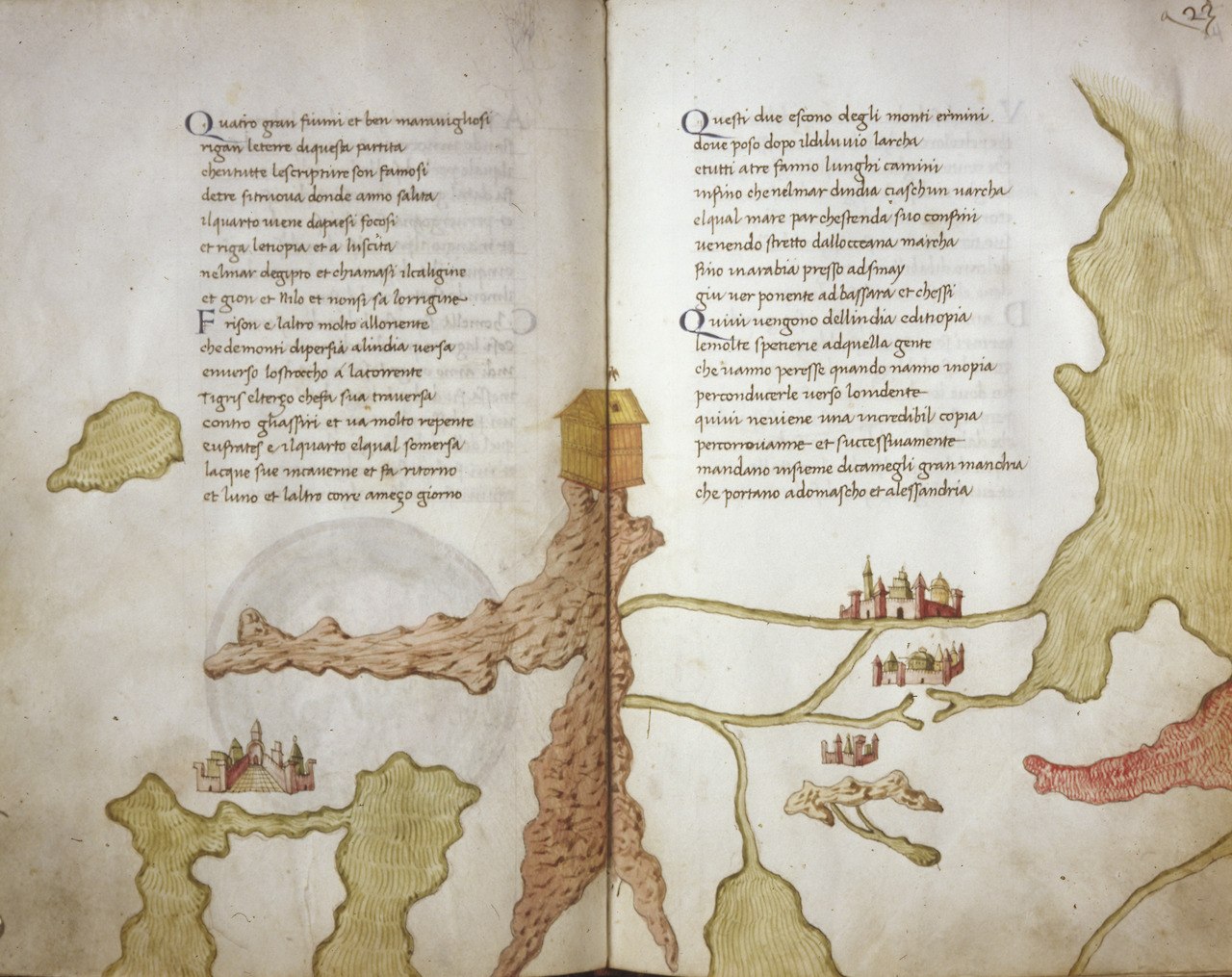
15th-century manuscript of La Sfera attributed to Leonardo Dati or his brother Gregorio

Leonardo di Piero Dati (1360 – 16 March 1425) was an Italian friar and humanist. He was Master of the Order of Preachers (The Dominicans) from 1414 to his death.

== Life ==
He was a Prior of Santa Maria Novella from 1401, and took part in the Council of Pisa of 1409. Dati was the head of the Dominicans belonging to the Roman obedience during the Great Schism. At the time of the Council of Constance, Dati became Master General of a reunited Dominican Order. Dati then focused on the internal reform of the order, authoring the tract Lamentationes de regularibus observantiis lapsis, in which he expressed strong dissatisfaction with the laxity and confusion of the order. His sermons at Pisa and Constance include references to literary texts, and he was well known as an author of commentaries on Aristotle. Leonardo also gave financial aid to his brother Gregorio, a Florentine merchant and diarist.

Both Leonardo and Gregorio Dati are attributed authorship of La Sfera ("The Sphere"), an astronomical-geographic poemetto in ottave, written in the second half of the 14th century, and a work much popular in its time. This work in verse gives information about the world, the marinaresche compass and other things, adding observations, notes about travel and designs. In some manuscripts of La Sfera there are designs representing ports, headlands, islands, linked by many lines.

Dati's sermons on the feast of St. Francis (4 October 1416) and the feast of the Circumcision of Jesus (3 January 1417) advocated respect for papal power and reform within the context of the established order. The earlier sermon touched off an exchange of polemical memoranda between Dati and supporters of conciliar supremacy. Dati then addressed issues raised in this exchange in the later sermon. Dati's discussion of circumcision was traditional for his time, describing the Jewish rite as superseded by baptism.

He is buried in the Cappella Rucellai at Santa Maria Novella. His tombstone is attributed to Lorenzo Ghiberti.

== Works ==
- La Sfera
- Trophaeum Anglaricum

== Sources ==
- Hillenbrand, Eugen. "Die Observantenbewegung in der deutschen Ordensprovinz der Dominikaner," in Elm, Kaspar, ed. Reformbemühungen und Observanzbestrebungen im spätmittelalterlichen Ordenswesen. Berliner Historische Studien, 14, Ordensstudien 6. Berlin, Duncker and Humblot, 1989: 232–233.

Preceded by Tommaso Paccaroni	Master General of the Dominican Order; 1414–1425	Succeeded by Barthélémy Texier
