= David Collischon =

British entrepreneur

David Collischon (19 July 1937 – 14 April 2016) was a British entrepreneur who, in 1980, bought the rights to the Filofax system and later floated his company on the stock market.
