= The Journal =

The Journal may refer to:

== Newspapers ==
- The Journal (Adelaide), a newspaper published in South Australia
- The Journal (Ireland), an online newspaper in Ireland
- The Journal (Newcastle upon Tyne), a daily newspaper produced in Newcastle upon Tyne, England, United Kingdom
- The Journal (New Ulm), a daily newspaper in New Ulm, Minnesota, United States
- The Journal (student newspaper), a fortnightly, citywide student newspaper in Edinburgh, Scotland, United Kingdom
- The Journal (South Carolina), a five-day-per week newspaper in the United States
- The Journal (West Virginia), a daily newspaper produced in Martinsburg, West Virginia, United States
- The Journal, a nickname for The Wall Street Journal
- The Journal, a weekly newspaper published in El Cerrito, California by the East Bay Times
- The Queen's Journal, or simply The Journal, the student newspaper published at Queen's University, Ontario, Canada
- The Journal, an alumni-sponsored news magazine about the Carey Law School of the University of Pennsylvania

== Television ==
=== Episodes ===
- "The Journal", 6teen season 3, episode 4 (2007)
- "The Journal", Hey Arnold! season 5, episodes 17–18 (2002)
- "The Journal", Teenage Mutant Ninja Turtles (2003) season 6, episode 13 (2006)
- "The Journal", The Lazarus Man episode 12 (1996)
- "The Journal", The Secret World of Alex Mack season 2, episode 1 (1995)
- "The Journal", The Waltons season 8, episode 7 (1979)

=== Shows ===
- The Journal (Canadian TV program), a Canadian current affairs TV program broadcast from 1982 to 1992
- The Journal, the hourly English version of the international news program Journal, available in multiple languages by Deutsche Welle

== Other ==
- The Journal (thejournalmag.org), a literary journal published by Ohio State University
- the Journal, a short-lived (two issues, 1999–2000) poetry magazine by Billy Mills and Catherine Walsh

== See also ==
- Journal (disambiguation)
- Journal News (disambiguation)
