= East Texas, Pennsylvania =

Unincorporated community in Pennsylvania, US

- Unincorporated community
- Location within Pennsylvania Location within the United States
- Coordinates: 40°32′51″N 75°33′41″W
- Country: United States
- State: Pennsylvania
- County: Lehigh
- Township: Lower Macungie
- Elevation: 440 ft (130 m)

Population (2016)
  - Unincorporated community: 109
  - Metro: 865,310 (US: 68th)
- Time zone: UTC-5 (EST)
  - Summer (DST): UTC-4 (EDT)
- ZIP Code: 18046
- Area codes: 610 and 484
- GNIS feature ID: 1173885
- Primary airport: Lehigh Valley International Airport
- Major hospital: Lehigh Valley Hospital–Cedar Crest
- School district: East Penn

East Texas is a village in Lower Macungie Township in Lehigh County, Pennsylvania. It is part of the Lehigh Valley, which had a population of 861,899 and was the 68th-most populous metropolitan area in the U.S. as of the 2020 census.

Little Lehigh Creek forms its natural southern boundary. While the village has its own box post office, with ZIP Code of 18046, surrounding areas use the Allentown ZIP Code of 18106 and the Macungie ZIP Code of 18062.

The community was named after the state of Texas. The community's name was prefixed with "East" to avoid repetition with another Texas in the state. Day-Timer, the global manufacturer of calendars and organizational products, maintains one of its four U.S. operational and production offices in East Texas.

== Education ==
East Texas is served by East Penn School District. Emmaus High School serves grades nine through twelve. Eyer Middle School and Lower Macungie Middle School, both located in Macungie, serve grades six through eight.
