= Personal organizer =

Notebook including a diary, calendar, address book, etc.

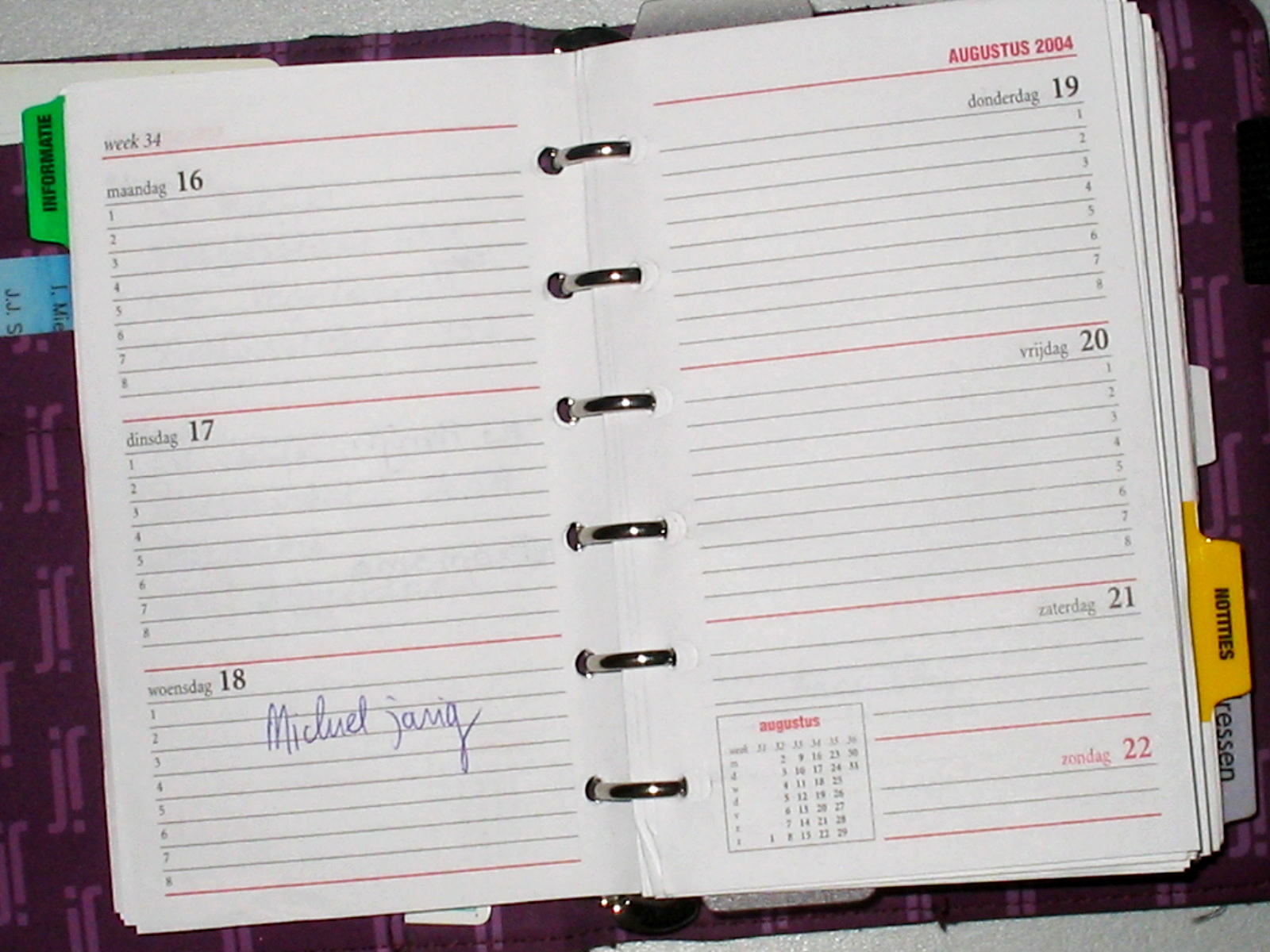
Daily agenda

A personal organizer, also known as a datebook, date log, daybook, day planner, personal analog assistant, book planner, year planner, or agenda (from Latin agenda – things to do), is a portable book or binder designed for personal management. It typically includes sections such as a diary, calendar, address book, blank paper, checklists, and additional useful information like maps and telephone codes. It is related to the separate desktop stationery items that have one or more of the same functions, such as appointment calendars, rolodexes, notebooks, and almanacs.

== History ==
By the end of the 20th century, paper-and-binder personal organizers started to be replaced by electronic devices such as personal digital assistants (PDAs), personal information manager software, and online organizers. This process accelerated in the beginning of the 21st century with the advent of smartphones, tablet computers, smartwatches and a variety of mobile apps which enhance the potential for personal organisation and productivity.

They were sometimes referred to as a filofax, after the UK-based company Filofax that produces a popular range of personal organiser wallets.

== See also ==
=== Relevant topics ===
- Bullet journal – Paper-based personal organizer
- Task management, the process of overseeing a task through its lifecycle
- Time management – The process of planning

=== Commercial products ===
- Day-Timer – American manufacturer
- Filofax – UK company
- Franklin Planner – Commercial personal organizer
- Hipster PDA – Satirical pen and paper personal organizer
- Psion Organiser – Palmtop pocket computer from Psion
