= Diary (stationery) =

Stationery format or an instance thereof

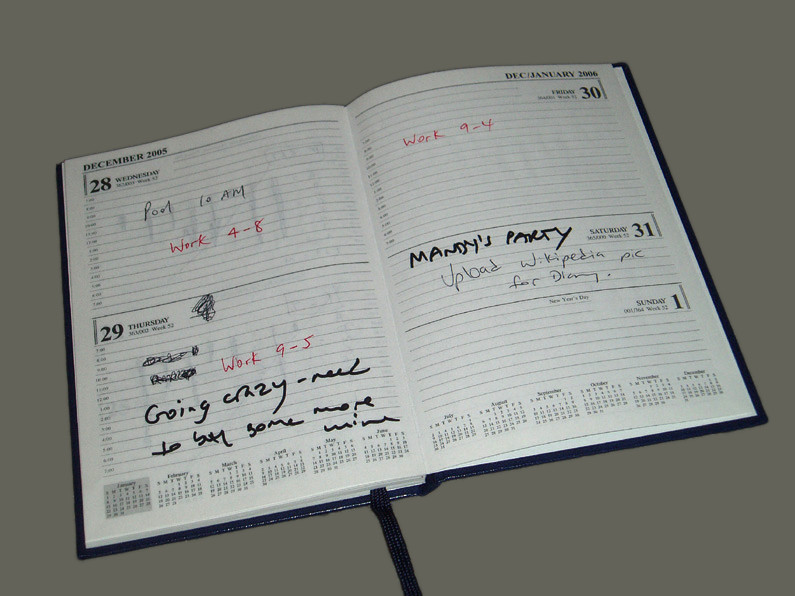
A medium-sized desk diary, with lines for hours in the working day. This type may also be called an appointment diary.

In stationery, a diary (UK and Commonwealth English), datebook, daybook, appointment book, planner or agenda (American English) is a small book containing a main diary section with a space for each day of the year with room for notes, a calendar. Usually, various pages at the beginning and end contained various pieces of reference information, which may include maps and telephone codes, and pages for a short address book at the end. Most diaries are pre-printed for a specific year on the cover. With each day's space, they were able to be printed with the day of the week. However, diaries that can be used for any year are also produced. Page-marker ribbons are commonly included. The US Customs official definition of a diary is: "A book prepared for keeping a daily record, or having spaces with printed dates for daily memoranda and jottings; also applied to calendars containing daily memoranda on matters of importance to people generally, or to members of a particular profession, occupation, or pursuit".

The main different sizes produced are the small pocket diary and larger desk diary, both of which come in many different sizes. Any size may be referred to as an appointment diary, especially larger diaries with pre-printed lines for each period in the day, as in the picture above. A large variety of layout formats are sold, including:

- page per day
- week per view/opening
- week per page
- month per view/opening

Often, as in the diary pictured above, weekend days are given less space than workdays. Small calendars of the current month, and if there is room, previous and following months at the bottom of the page are also typical.

Most diaries run from January to December, but school or academic diaries, also known as "mid-year" diaries, run for twelve months from shortly before the beginning of the school or academic year. Many diaries are themed for different interest groups, and contain relevant reference information to that interest. Others are given as gifts by businesses. Especially in diaries for children or young people, many are now branded for fictional characters, authors, recording artists or magazines.

The British stationery business now called the Letts Filofax Group Ltd produced the world's first pre-printed diary in 1812, calling it the "Commercial Diary". Printed diaries are now competing with loose-leaf personal organizers and various electronic forms of diary functions on personal computers, personal digital assistants and mobile telephones.

== See also ==
- Notebook
- Note-taking
