= List of journals =

List of journals may refer to:

- Lists of academic journals
- Lists of magazines
- Lists of newspapers

== See also ==
- Journal (disambiguation)
- List of diarists
