= The Journal-News (Hillsboro, Illinois) =

- Type: Biweekly newspaper
- Owner(s): John and Susan Galer
- Publisher: Michael Plunkett
- Editor: Mary (Galer) Herschelman
- Founded: 2004
- Headquarters: 431 S. Main St. Hillsboro, IL 62049
- Website: thejournal-news.net

The Journal-News is a newspaper based in Hillsboro, Illinois. It was formed by the 2004 merger of two Hillsboro newspapers: the Hillsboro Journal, which had existed since 1886, and the Montgomery County News, which had existed since 1983. As of 2017 the paper was owned by John and Susan Galer.
