= Hipster PDA =

Pen and paper personal organizer

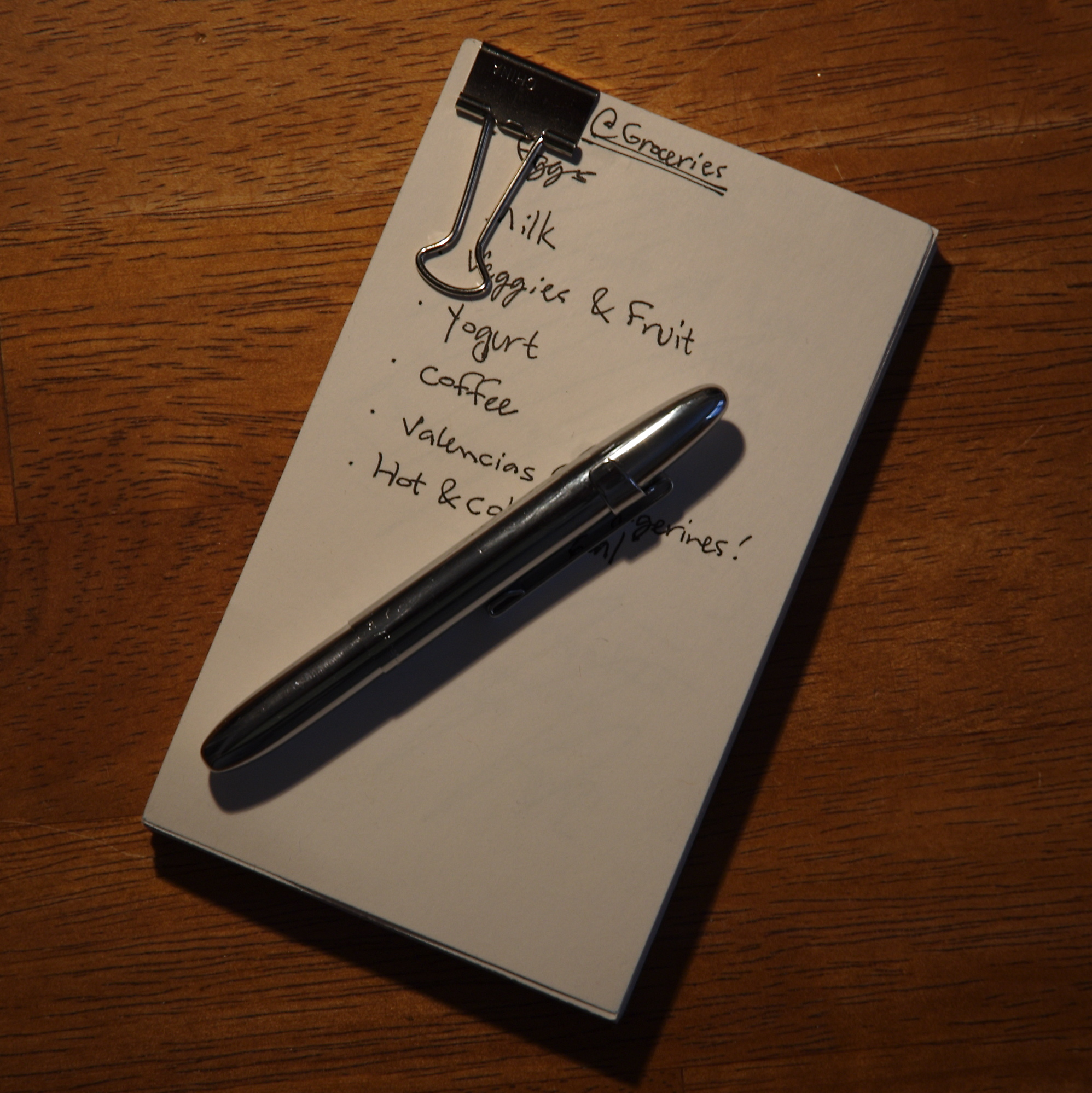
A Hipster PDA

The Hipster PDA is a paper-based personal organizer, popularized by Merlin Mann in 2004. Originally a tongue-in-cheek reaction to the increasing expense and complexity of personal digital assistants (PDA), the Hipster PDA (said to stand for "Parietal Disgorgement Aid" and often abbreviated to "hPDA") comprises a sheaf of index cards held together with a binder clip. Following widespread coverage in the media and blogs, the hPDA became a popular personal management tool, particularly with followers of David Allen's Getting Things Done methodology.

Although it began as a joke, or perhaps a statement about technology fetishism, the Hipster PDA rapidly gained popularity with serious users, with hundreds posting pictures of their customized hPDAs on photo sharing sites and exchanging tips on Internet mailing lists. Advocates of the hPDA claim that it is a cheap, lightweight, freeform organizer that does not need batteries and is unlikely to be stolen. Enthusiasts also design and share index-card-size printable templates for storing contacts, to-do lists, calendars, notes, project plans, and so on.

A Hipster Nano PDA uses business cards with blank backs and one that has a calendar on the back.

== See also ==
- Bullet journal – Method for note taking
- Card file – System of small items of information stored on paper slips or cards
- Personal knowledge management – Process by which a person manages knowledge
- Personal information management – Tools and systems for managing one's own data
- Zettelkasten – Knowledge management and note-taking method
