= Filofax =

UK company

Filofax UK
- Type: Personal organisers
- Founded: 1921
- Headquarters: Dalkeith, Scotland
- Parent: Letts Filofax Group Ltd
- Website: filofax.com

Filofax is a company based in Scotland that produces a range of personal organiser wallets. The organisers are traditionally leather bound and have a six-ring loose-leaf binder system. The design originated at Lefax, a United States company from Philadelphia which was exporting products to the UK. The company also markets a range of personal leather goods and luggage under the "Filofax" brand.

== Products ==
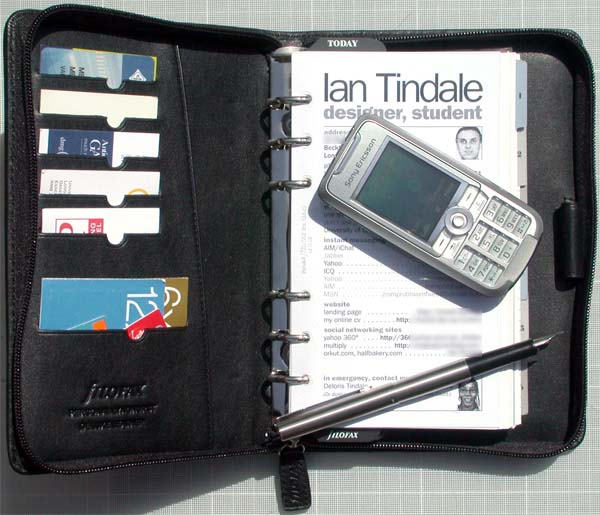
A Filofax organiser

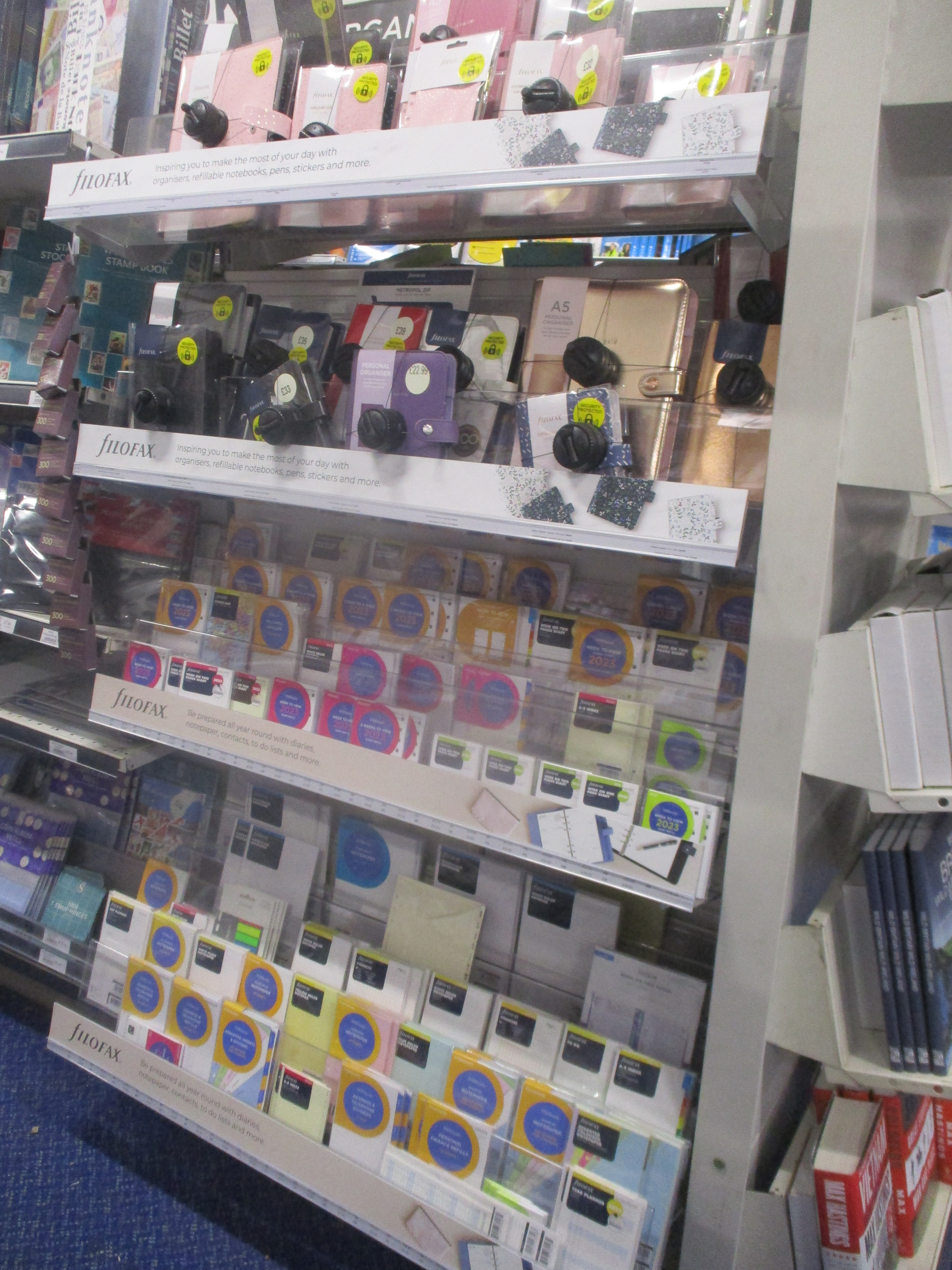
Filofax branded and compatible inserts and Filofaxes on sale in WH Smith in Pontefract.

The popularity of the Filofax personal organiser grew enormously during the early 1980s due to its association with Yuppie culture, where it was regarded as a "must-have" accessory, in the days before electronic organisers.

A range of insert page formats are sold, including calendars, notesheets, password lists and a thin calculator.

== Company ==
The company was known as Norman & Hill until the mid-1980s, when it renamed itself after its most popular product. For much of its life it was based in South Woodford, Essex. In the early 1980s, it moved to nearby Barkingside. It was bought by David Collischon. In the late 1980s David Collischon floated the company on the stock exchange resulting in control of the company being taken over by Nightingale with Robin Field taking the role of MD. In the early 1990s it moved its offices to central London, near Oxford Street, and subcontracted its warehouse operation to Crick in Northamptonshire. The company was acquired by Day Runner, Inc. in 1998. In 2001, Day Runner, Inc. sold Filofax.

Filofax is part of the UK-based Letts Group. In 2006, Phoenix Equity Partners led a secondary buyout of the business. The deal provided an exit for private equity firm Dunedin Capital Partners. In 2012, the company was acquired by HSGP Investments.
