= FranklinCovey =

American publisher and education company

- Trade name: FranklinCovey
- Formerly: Franklin Quest Co. and Covey Leadership Center
- Type: Public company
- Traded as: NYSE: FC; Russell 2000 Component
- Industry: Business consulting, talent development, education and training services
- Founded: May 30, 1997
- Headquarters: Salt Lake City, Utah
- Key people: Paul Walker, Chairman/CEO; Stephen Young, CFO/CAO/VP of Finance/Controller; Stephen R. Covey, co-founder Hyrum W. Smith, co-founder
- Products: Leadership and individual effectiveness training
- Revenue: ▼267 million USD (FY2025)
- Net income: ▼3.07 million USD (FY2025)

Franklin Covey Co., trading as FranklinCovey and based in Salt Lake City, Utah, is a coaching company that provides training and assessment services in the areas of leadership, individual effectiveness, and business execution for organizations and individuals. The company was formed on May 30, 1997, as a result of merger between Hyrum W. Smith's Franklin Quest and Stephen R. Covey's Covey Leadership Center. Among other products, the company has marketed the FranklinCovey planning system, modeled in part on the writings of Benjamin Franklin, and The 7 Habits of Highly Effective People, based on Covey's research into leadership ethics.

FC Organizational Products is the official licensee of FranklinCovey products and continues to produce paper planning products based on Covey's time management system. FranklinCovey also has sales channels in more than 120 countries worldwide.

== History ==
Franklin Quest and the Covey Leadership Center operated independently until January 22, 1997, when the two companies jointly announced a merger and public offering valued at $160 million.

After the merger, the company had 117 retail stores in 37 states and an international presence with stores in Canada (3) Mexico (1), and Hong Kong (1). The stores were renamed Franklin Covey 7 Habits Stores, redesigned, and stocked with 300 new products, including software and devices.

The company held naming rights to a minor league baseball stadium in Salt Lake City, Utah from 1994 to 2009, when the name changed from Franklin Covey Field to Smith's Ballpark.

In 1998, the company's chairman Hyrum W. Smith was appointed to a two-year term on the board of directors of the United States Chamber of Commerce.

By 2005, the company had closed its chain of 185 retail stores and its products division. After redefining itself as a "performance improvement company," it had 590 employees in the U.S., Canada, Britain, Australia, and Japan, while also operating through licensees in over 130 other countries.

Now operating as a training and consulting company, Franklin Covey reported revenues of $280.5 million U.S. dollars for (FY2023).

== Merger ==
Hyrum W. Smith, then the CEO of Franklin Quest, expected that the 1997 acquisition would increase market value through the synergistic combination of Covey's 7 Habits book with the Franklin Planner system and with the company's associated training courses. However, after the merger FranklinCovey's stock price dropped from around $20 per share to a low of under $1 per share by early 2003. As of June 1, 2006, it traded around $7 per share which has increased their purchase rate. From late 2009 to mid-2010, the stock price moved in the range $5.5 to $8. The merger was criticized in the business press for "bloated bureaucracy, poor planning, and internal bickering."

== Products and services ==
In 2008, FranklinCovey's CEO, Bob Whitman, changed the company's direction by selling off its paper products business and shifting focus to in-person training sessions and live-online training through the internet. The spinoff of the paper planner business became known as FC Organizational Products and maintains a contract with FranklinCovey as the authorized licensee of the brand name. Together the two companies still maintain one retail location, located at FranklinCovey's corporate campus in Salt Lake City.

FranklinCovey has more recently focused on various in-person and live-online training for individuals and organizations, ranging from leadership development training, business execution planning, sales performance, and individual effectiveness training. Typically, the company will correspond their products with book launches written by FranklinCovey consultants or industry thought leaders. The company's core training products it remains known for is The 7 Habits of Highly Effective People, Leading at the Speed of Trust, and The 4 Disciplines of Execution.

The LeaderInMe program is a "whole school transformation model and process" based around Covey's work. As of 2024, there were LeaderInMe schools in the Guatemala, Jordan, Malaysia, Mexico, the Philippines, the Netherlands, Qatar, Taiwan, Vietnam, the United Kingdom and every state in the United States. According to the Center for Research and Reform in Education at Johns Hopkins University, students at schools using the program reported that teachers were "nicer" and that discipline problems had declined.

== Employment ==
Franklin Covey was a relatively early adopter of employee protections against discrimination based on sexual orientation.

In a case that helped establish that infertility is a disability under the Americans with Disabilities Act, the court sided with the company when an employee lawsuit claimed that limits on health insurance benefits for fertility treatments were discriminatory.

A 2020 analysis by Yahoo Finance concluded that, at a salary of $575,000 and total compensation of 2.3 million USD, then-CEO Bob Whitman was being compensated consistent with the industry average for similar companies.
