= Journal (Canadian TV series) =

- Genre: Short film presentation
- Country of origin: Canada
- Original language: English
- No. of seasons: 1

Production
- Producer: Don Haig
- Production company: Film Arts

Original release
- Network: CBC Television
- Release: 15 May – 25 September 1977

Journal is a Canadian short film television series that aired on CBC Television in 1977.

== Premise ==
Independent short films were featured in this series. For example, Spence Bay was created in their northern community by a group of secondary school students and their teacher. Other films included Peggy Peacock and Jock Mlynek's North Hatley Antique Sale and Quebec Village; Mark Irwin's The Duel - Fencing, For The Love Of A Horse, Lacrosse, Sailaway, and Step By Step; and Tony Hall's Serpent River Paddlers.

This series was unrelated to CBC's news and current affairs series The Journal.

== Scheduling ==
This 15-minute series was broadcast Sundays at 12:00 p.m. (Eastern) from 15 May to 25 September 1977.
