= Buonaccorso Pitti =

Buonaccorso Pitti was a prominent Florentine merchant in the late 14th and early 15th centuries. His family was very prestigious and his father very involved in politics. He was a gambler and often made unsafe investments, though he managed to make money from it several times during his life. He bought and sold horses, wine, wool, and clothing among other things. We know an unusual amount about him because his diary has survived.

In 1422, he was elected the Standard Bearer of Justice, Florence's highest post. In 1401, while serving as the Florentine ambassador to Bavaria, he, his brothers, and their descendants were ennobled by Rupert, King of the Romans, after having saved his life by thwarting a poisoning attempt by the Duke of Milan. His son, Luca, built the Palazzo Pitti in Florence, but never finished it, it was given to him, but he sold it in 1549. Buonaccorso's descendants, the Counts Buonacorsi di Pistoia, moved from Tuscany to Bavaria in the late 19th century. The family emigrated to the U.S. in the early 20th century.

== Patent of nobility ==
The patent of nobility granted to Buonaccorso and his brothers in 1401 follows:

Letter of Familiaritas of Bonacorsi and his brothers, and that they can wear a coat of arms:

Rupert, by the grace of God King of the Romans, always August, to the noblemen, the esteemed Peter, Franz, Bartholmew, and Alois Bonacorsi, brothers of the same Bonacorsi family and esteemed sons of the late Nero, faithfully beloved of me and of the Holy Empire: Let there be royal favor and every good. Although a royal and liberal munificence rightly exists toward all the faithful of the Holy Empire, because of a certain general clemency native to it, nevertheless, it ought to extend more richly the gifts of its generosity to those whom reputation more solemnly gives evidence that they have labored with more fervent zeal for special honors of the Holy Empire. Hence, because with regard given to the constancy of loyalty and to the useful services of sincere fidelity, which you, Bonacorsi, have faithfully shown to us and to the Holy Empire, you and your brothers inscribed above ought to show to us something else. Wherefore, we graciously admit you and anyone of your family into our friendship, and we add you to the community of our friends, with firm acknowledgement, recognizing that you enjoy and rejoice in all individual privileges, prerogatives, favors, and liberties wherever you wish, which our other friends enjoy however they wish, forever, in all things, et that in all your individual dealings and those dealings incumbent upon you, you implore the royal crown under full faith. We also grant this special favor of our royal munificence of majesty mentioned above by royal authority for the present, both to you and to anyone of your family, and to those legitimately descended from you, that you and anyone of your family ought freely to carry and wear for the performance of military display in wars, tournaments, and whatever other military acts everywhere, a coat of arms depicted with respect to its circumference and colors accordingly in the handiwork of the painter, with special figures in its images, with any impediment thoroughly removed, with the arms of any others always preserved. The shape and figure of this coat of arms contains alternating black and white waves and through the length of the shield a golden rampant lion with a red crown and red claws as is depicted in its very form in the picture below.

The witnesses of this document are the Venerable Frederick, Archbishop of Cologne, Archchancellor of the Holy Roman Empire throughout Italy, Rabanus, Bishop of Spirensis, Conrad de Soltano, Prince-Bishop of Verden, the noblemen Emicho, Count of Lynnigen, Master of the Royal Curia, Guther, Count of Schwarzburg, Friederich, elder son of Morse and Count in Sarwerde, the Honorable Henry, superior of the Church of Saint Severinus, Colomanus Albert Goletus and Colbo de Buchart, soldiers, Nicloaus Buman, Prothonotary of the Royal Curia, Johann de Stamenstorff et Johann de Empache, Canons of the Church in Trent, Bertholdus de Novadomo, Rabanus de Helmstat, and Dieter Betendorffer, as testimony of this letter under the addition of the Seal of Our Royal Majesty. Given at Trent, the 15th day of the one thousandth, four hundredth first year of Our Lord, during the first year of our reign.

By order of the Lord King,

Johann Winheim
