= Franklin Planner =

Commercial personal organizer

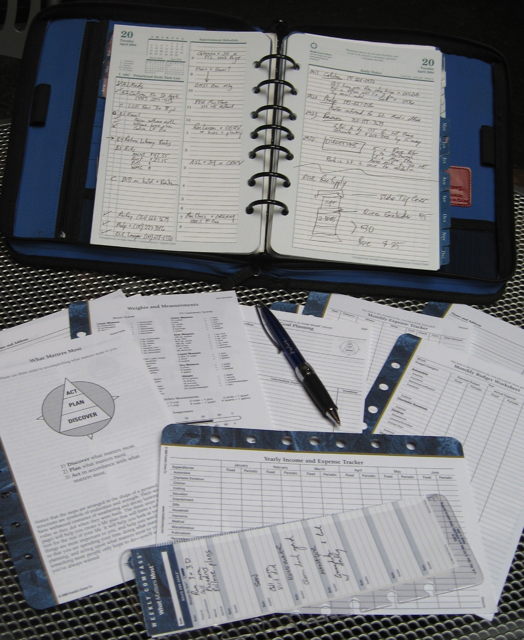
A Franklin Planner in a binder with various examples of data forms

The Franklin Planner is a paper-based time management system created by Hyrum W. Smith and first sold in 1984 by Franklin International Institute, Inc. The planner itself is the paper component of the time management system which he developed. Hyrum Smith based many of his ideas from the teachings of Charles Hobbs who utilized a similar instrument called the Day-Timer, which predated the Franklin Planner.

The planner pages are drilled, loose-leaf style pages in different sizes and formats. The formats have been updated through the years. Most planners contain areas for an appointment schedule, prioritized daily tasks, and notes. A key section at the end of the planner contains addresses. Other inserts include ledger sheets for tracking finances or vehicle mileage, exercise logs, and other individualized reference materials.

Smith named his planning system after Benjamin Franklin (1706–1790) who kept a small private book, as detailed in The Autobiography of Benjamin Franklin. A core technique of the Franklin Planner system involves beginning each day with 15 minutes of "solitude and planning".

== Versions ==
The planner comes in four sizes:

1. Monarch (8.5×11″, 216×280 mm)
2. Classic (5.5×8.5″, 140×216 mm)
3. Compact (4.25×6.75″,108×172 mm)
4. Pocket (3.5×6″, 89×153 mm)

== Functions ==
Because of its overall design, the Franklin Planner system lends itself to use as a tickler file, as well as a long-range planner. Most annual versions of the page inserts for the Franklin system include yearly calendars for at least five years; future monthly calendars for at least three years, and the most recent year's pages and associated monthly calendars for planning. When used as a package, the system provides a means of tracking minute details; storage of signed agreements (especially if pages are archived in the archival binders); and tracking of business and personal expenses for taxes.

== Marketing ==
The Franklin Planner is marketed to consumers through an e-commerce web site, a U.S.-based call center, and a GSA government contract. Marketing channels exist outside the U.S.

== History ==
The Franklin Day Planner was first produced in 1984 by the Franklin International Institute, Inc., which later became Franklin Quest. In 1997, Franklin Quest and the Covey Leadership Center merged to become FranklinCovey. The Franklin Planner has continued to be sold under the FranklinCovey name to this day. However, in 2008, FranklinCovey sold its Consumer Solutions Business Unit, including Franklin Planner, to a private equity firm. The parent company of the Franklin Planner is FC Organizational Products, LLC, which is the exclusive worldwide licensee of the FranklinCovey brand.
