= Bullet journal =

Method for note taking

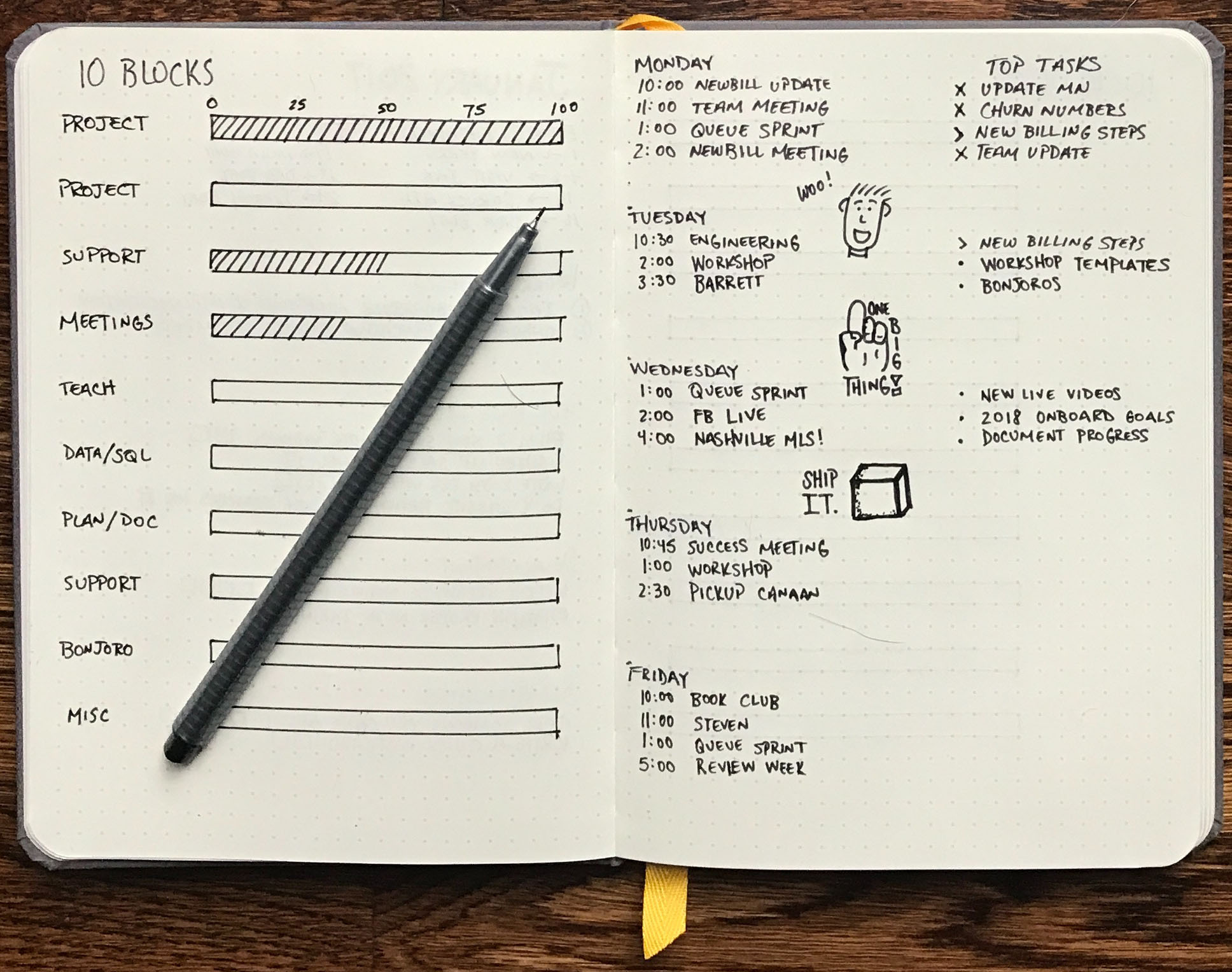
Example page from a bullet journal, showing some typical notations.

A bullet journal (also known as a BuJo) is a paper-based method of personal organization developed by digital product designer Ryder Carroll.

The bullet journal system organizes journaling, time management, brainstorming, note-taking and other productivity and organizational tasks into a single notebook. The name "bullet journal" comes from the use of abbreviated bullet points to log information, but it also partially comes from the use of dotted journals, which are gridded using dots rather than lines. It was shared in public in 2013.

The bullet journal has a versatile layout and can be designed in many different ways depending on the purpose of the user. The journal is supposed to track long-term habits or tasks that the writer can review and reflect on. The use of a bullet journal can have a wide variety of effects on the reader.

== History ==
Ryder Carroll began looking for a simple method of personal organization in college in the late 1990s. Diagnosed with attention deficit disorder as a child, he wanted a system to help "move past his learning disabilities". By the time he graduated from college, he had devised the bullet journal method. A friend encouraged him to share his method, and he began sharing it online in 2013.

It attracted attention on social media, earning $80,000 in Kickstarter funding to create a centralized online community of users. It was the subject of over 3 million Instagram posts by December 2018. Carroll gave a TED talk about bullet journaling at the 2017 TEDxYale event, titled "How to declutter your mind – keep a journal." Carroll also published a book on the system, The Bullet Journal Method, in 2018.The method has been influenced by Carroll's experience as an app, web, and game designer, as well as by his interest in scrapbooking.

== Composition ==
The bullet journal is designed to be one notebook that can be an outlet for pondering a wide range of thoughts/events or a space for reflection on different thoughts and life experiences. It can be used as an organizational tool, and keep track of tasks, notes, appointments, and meetings. It can also be used as a medium for reflection, such as a diary that tracks moods and habits, and/or as an artistic outlet that contains drawings, quotes, and color.

=== Elements ===
Bullet journals can be structured in various ways, which contributes to their usefulness, but this also makes them more intimidating to start. The bullet journal system is flexible so that users can customize it to their needs. The method requires a pen or pencil and a notebook, but can also include markers, stickers, stencils, colorful tape, etc. There are commercially produced notebooks designed for bullet journaling, but they are not required. Since the introduction of bullet journaling, its growing popularity has contributed to an increase in sales of traditional stationery products, such as notebooks and pens.

There are many different basic structures in designing a bullet journal, but the commonly included features are daily, future, and monthly logging. Daily logging records can contain each day's tasks, meetings, and reflections, and each day is edited and recorded after being written. Typically, this type of logging takes up the majority of the journal and is used to track habits or changes. Monthly logging is a place for long-term plans or important events each month, and future logging is for long-term projects that may take multiple months or years to complete.

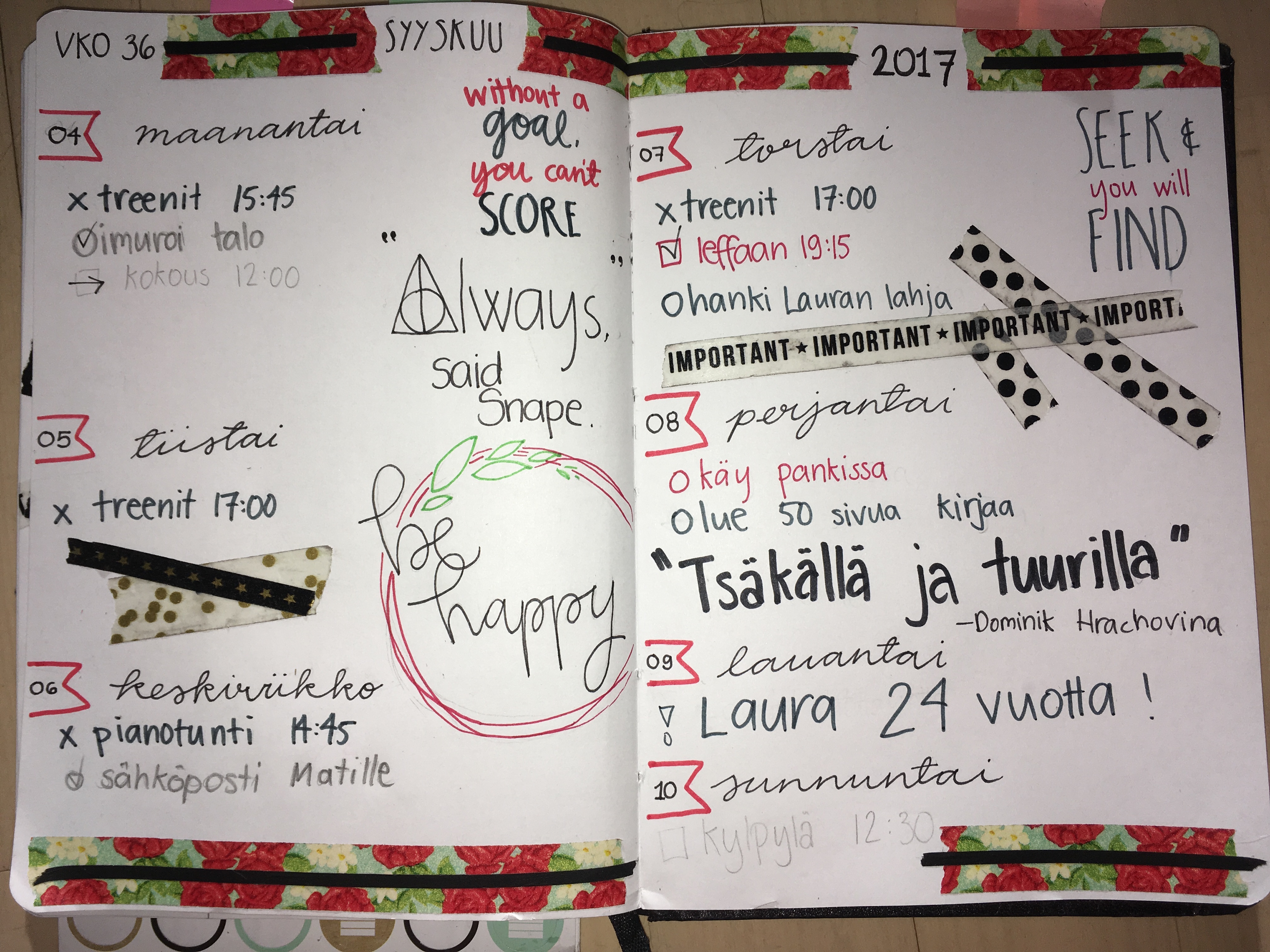
An example of a bullet journal, using tape, colors, events, and quotes.

Many journals also include an index, which is located at the front or back of the book. The index provides key information, projects, or days written in the journal, and the corresponding pages to locate these details. Along with that, there is usually a key at the beginning of the journal to explain how to read the journal and decode any symbols, shapes, or colors.

=== Styles ===
Since the introduction of the original bullet journal method, they have grown to encompass a wide variety of styles. Some journals encompass a large variety of colors, pictures, and words, and the user can spend an hour or more every day designing it, while others are more minimalistic and just require a few minutes every day. There are many design inspirations on Pinterest, Instagram, and TikTok, but the flexibility of the journal helps each user adapt the journal to themselves.

== See also ==
- Hipster PDA – Pen and paper personal organizer
- Information overload – Decision making with too much information
- Personal knowledge management – Process by which a person manages knowledge
- Personal information management – Tools and systems for managing one's own data
- Zettelkasten – Knowledge management and note-taking method
