= OmniFocus =

Task manager software

- OmniFocus 3 running on macOS
- Developer: The Omni Group
- Release: January 8, 2008; 18 years ago
- Stable release: macOS: 4.8.3 (September 22, 2025; 12 months ago) [±]; iOS: 4.8.3 (September 22, 2025; 12 months ago) [±]; visionOS: 4.8.3 (September 22, 2025; 12 months ago) [±]; Web: 2025.09.23 (September 23, 2025; 12 months ago) [±]
- Operating system: macOS, iOS, iPadOS, visionOS
- Available in: English, Japanese, French, German, Spanish, Portuguese, Russian, Italian, Dutch, and Simplified Chinese
- Type: Task management software
- License: Proprietary
- Website: www.omnigroup.com/omnifocus/

OmniFocus is a personal task manager by the Omni Group for macOS and iOS. The declared goal of the program is to be able to capture thoughts and ideas into to do lists. The program uses concepts and techniques described in the book and productivity system called Getting Things Done (GTD) by David Allen.

== History ==
OmniFocus has its roots in the Kinkless kGTD add/scripts for the Omni Group's OmniOutliner product. Kinkless (kGTD) was developed by Ethan J. A. Schoonover to enable those following the GTD methodology. The Omni Group subsequently brought Ethan along with Merlin Mann to form a project team to create the OmniFocus application.

In 2018, version 3 of OmniFocus was released for iOS and macOS. With the release, the previous concept of contexts taken from GTD was replaced with tags.

In 2019, OmniFocus 3 launched on the web as companion to macOS and iOS applications.

The current version is OmniFocus 4.

== Platforms ==
=== macOS ===
OmniFocus is available for macOS.

=== iOS ===
OmniFocus is available on iOS (including the iPod Touch, iPhone, Apple Watch and iPad), and Vision Pro.

=== Android ===
The Omni Group does not have plans to provide an Android application for OmniFocus. Google Play lists various third-party applications that interface with OmniFocus through the Omni Sync Server (e.g., Focus GTD).

=== Web application ===
On January 26, 2018, Ken Case, CEO of the Omni Group, announced in the Omni Group forums that OmniFocus for the web is under development. It will not be a standalone version; it will only sync with existing databases set up with the macOS or iOS versions of OmniFocus. A subscription fee will be charged for access. In December 2018, Ken Case shared more details about the upcoming subscription service, where users could subscribe to get access to both the native OmniFocus apps and OmniFocus for the web, or just the latter with a reduced subscription fee. The option to make one-time purchases of the macOS and iOS apps will remain.

== See also ==
- Getting Things Done
- Things
- Taskwarrior
- Org-mode
