= Things (software) =

Task management software

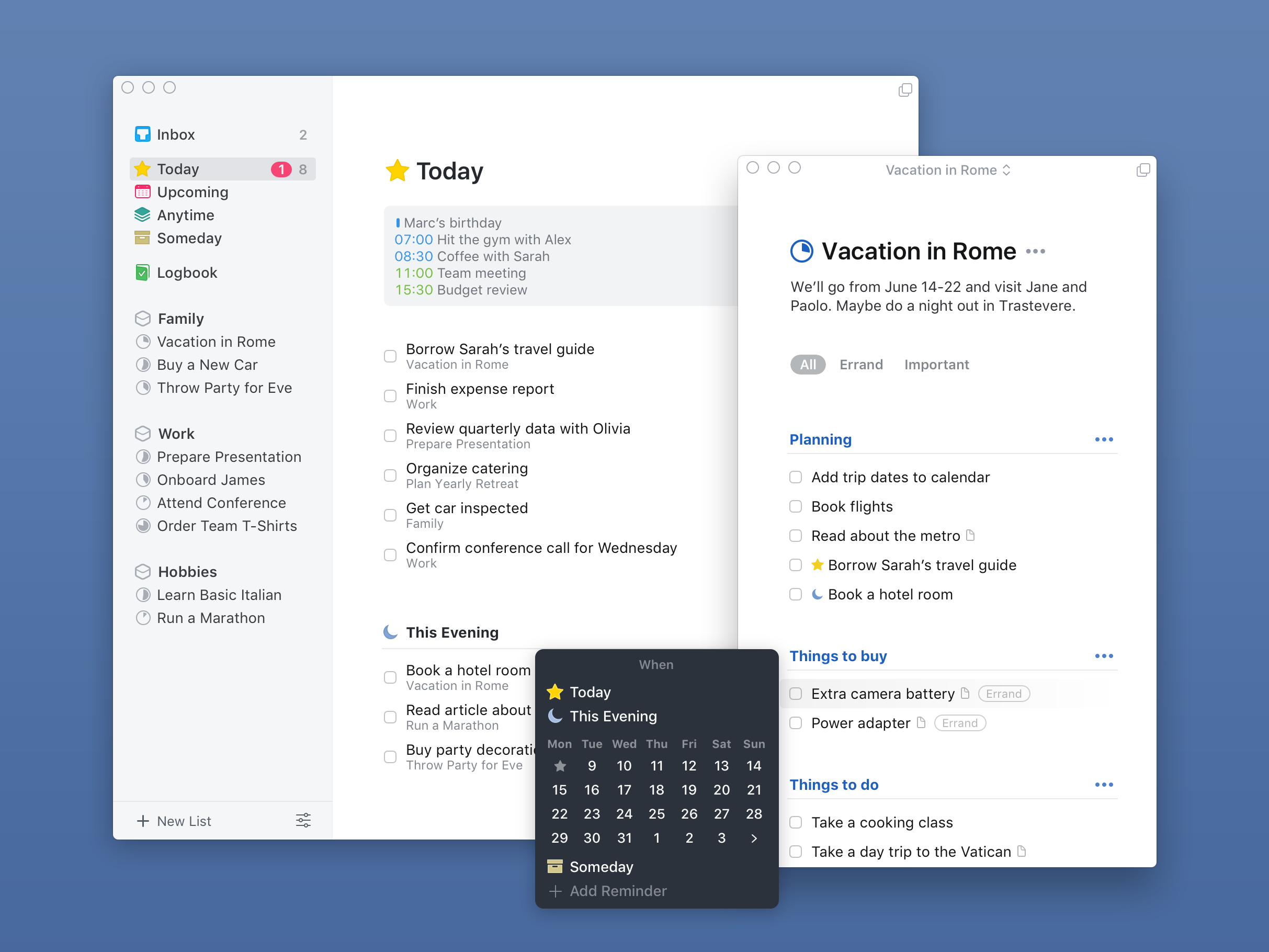
- A screenshot of Things' main window
- Developer: Cultured Code
- Stable release: 3.24.1 (Mac) 3.25.1 (iPad) 3.25.1 (iPhone) 3.25.1 (Vision) / 22 October 2026; 27 days ago
- Operating system: macOS, iPadOS, iOS, watchOS, visionOS
- Available in: English, French, German, Italian, Spanish, Russian, Japanese, Traditional Chinese, Simplified Chinese
- Type: Task management
- License: Proprietary
- Website: culturedcode.com/things/

Things is a task management app for macOS, iPadOS, iOS, watchOS, and visionOS made by Cultured Code, a software startup based in Stuttgart, Germany. It first released for Mac as an alpha that went out in late 2007 to 12,000 people and quickly gained popularity. The following July, when the App Store launched, it was among the first 552 apps available for iPhone. It was then released alongside the iPad in 2010, the Apple Watch in 2015, and the Apple Vision Pro in 2024.

In December 2013, Cultured Code announced that they had sold one million copies of the software to date, and in December 2014 the company announced that downloads had increased by an additional three million.

== Awards ==
Things has won multiple awards over the years. It first won the MacLife Editors' Choice Award in 2008, and then in 2009 it went on to win the Apple Design Award, the Macworld Editors' Choice Award, and the Macworld Best of Show Award. In 2012, after the release of Things 2, Apple selected it as Editors' Choice and named it among the App Store Best of 2012. Things won the Apple Design Award a second time with the release of Things 3 in 2017. Things has also received two MacStories Selects Awards, winning Best App Update of 2018 and Best New Feature of 2023.

== Features ==
=== Main features ===
Things allows to-dos to be subdivided into several sections, which roughly correspond to parts of the Getting Things Done methodology:

==== Collect ====
- Inbox is used to temporarily collect to-dos which have not been filed into a specific list yet.

==== Organize ====
- Projects are collections of to-dos that contribute to the completion of a larger goal (e.g., "Plan Holiday"). A project can be subdivided with headings. Once the project is finished, the user marks it complete and it moves to the Logbook with all the to-dos it contains.
- Areas can be used to group together projects and to-dos which correspond to the same, ongoing theme (e.g., "Work" or "Family"). Unlike projects, areas are perpetual, do not have a checkbox, and are never completed.

==== Schedule ====
- Today automatically collects to-dos which are due, or scheduled to begin, from all the user's lists into one centralized place; they are the user's priorities for the current day.
  - This Evening is a separate section at the bottom of Today where the user can set aside to-dos they don't plan to do until later in the day.
- Upcoming contains to-dos and projects that have been postponed to a specific date, as well as to-dos that are automatically generated based on repeating patterns chosen by the user.
- Anytime is an overview of active to-dos from across all of the user's projects and areas (i.e., to-dos not scheduled for a later date, or postponed in Someday).
- Someday is used to store to-dos which need to be done, but are not time critical (or are on hold).

=== Additional features ===
- Calendar integration allows the user to see their calendar events alongside their to-dos in the Today and Upcoming lists.
- Reminders integration allows the user to import to-dos from Apple's Reminders app into their Things inbox.
- Quick Entry is an extension on the Mac that allows the user to create to-dos while working in other apps. Activated by a global keyboard shortcut, it invokes a small pop-up window which can automatically include links to files or websites.
- Add to Things is an extension on iPhone and iPad that, like Quick Entry, allows the user to send to-dos to Things from other apps. The new to-do is saved to Things' inbox in the background.
- Spotlight integration allows the user to create to-dos in Things' Inbox via the Mac's system-wide pop-up.
- Siri integration allows the user to speak to-dos to their iPad, iPhone, or Apple Watch and have them automatically appear in Things without having to type.
- Shortcuts integration allows the user to automate common tasks by building shortcuts in Apple's Shortcuts app.
- Repeating To-Dos are automatically generated by the app based on flexible recurrence rules, such as the last day of every month, every other Thursday, or two weeks after the last one was completed, etc. – whatever the user chooses.
- Tags allow the user to further describe to-dos using the popular tagging organisation paradigm; lists can then be filtered by these tags to search for and focus on specific types of tasks.
- Markdown support allows the user to structure and style their notes with the popular Markdown syntax.
- Mail to Things is a cloud service that allows the user to send (or forward) emails to a private address and have the email automatically converted into a to-do in their Things inbox.
- Widgets allow the user to quickly glance at a list, add new to-dos, or track their daily progress without having to open the app.
- Control Buttons allow the user to quickly create to-dos or open lists from a device's Control Center, Lock Screen, or the Mac's menu bar.
- Things URLs is a URL scheme that allows the user to construct special links for doing such things as creating to-dos or projects based on predefined values, invoking searches, or filtering lists.
- Type Travel is a unique method for navigating the app on the user's Mac (or iPad with external keyboard) by simply typing where in the app they want to go: a project, area, to-do, or tag.
- Quick Find allows the user to search through all their to-dos across projects, areas, and the Logbook.
- Logbook is where projects and to-dos are stored for future reference after they've been completed.

=== Things Cloud ===
Things Cloud is a sync service that stores the user's to-dos and automatically keeps them updated across all their Apple devices. It was developed to replace the app's original sync technology, which only worked over a local network. The company began alpha testing the new service in 2011 and, after an extended beta period, launched it publicly on 9 August 2012 with the release of Things 2. A user can create a free Things Cloud account from within the apps' settings.

In 2015, the company announced "Nimbus" – an update to Things Cloud's architecture which introduced push sync through the cloud. The main benefit of the new push technology is that it utilizes APNs to deliver sync to iOS, iPadOS, and visionOS devices when the app isn't actively running.

In 2021, the company announced "Fractus" – a new method for syncing where only changed strings of text are sent to the server instead of entire notes, improving the speed and efficiency of the sync, and allowing for smarter conflict resolution.

In 2025, the company announced that Things Cloud had been completely rewritten in Apple's Swift programming language. Apple featured the work during their State of the Union address at WWDC 2025 and on their website.

== See also ==
- Getting Things Done
- OmniFocus
- Taskwarrior
