= Activity management =

How to Manage Records of Individual Workers

Activity management is the process of recording everything a worker does throughout a typical day, in the order that it is done, all while labeling their activity correctly. Tracking the progress of what is done by each worker in a typical day is becoming increasingly complex as organizations grow, both internally (growing employee numbers, responsibilities) and externally (multiple locations, remote employees). Activity management systems create an easily accessible format for tracking the performance of both employees and employers.

== Characteristics ==
A functional activity management environment places a heavy emphasis on properly defining the task at hand. The idea of activity management comes from the belief that in personal and group organization of workers, every action is related to higher levels of information, therefore proper labeling of the task is a critical element of the recording process. A task is related to a project, and that project is related to a higher subject level such as a customer or department or general category. With those labels in place, an employee would then describe the activity they have worked on, what they actually accomplished on the task, and any other details that they feel would be pertinent, including what still needs to be done, any future associated tasks, etc. Ideally, a typical activity entry would include all the elements below:

1. Activity – this is a brief description of what you actually do.
2. Type of Activity (meeting, phone, e-mail, etc.)
3. Task Name
4. Project Name
5. Category Name
6. Length of Time
7. Date

Tracking these 6 pieces of info on a timely basis creates an accurate and complete record and gives both employee and employer a substantial amount of performance data for that individual. It also assists in avoiding common miscommunications in the workplace and helps solidify and reinforce the role/importance of the task at hand. This type of activity management is influenced heavily from Peter Drucker's theory on time management among knowledge workers, and the belief that the closest thing to our thoughts that we can measure are our actions and activities. David Allen, whose Getting Things Done method rests similarly on the idea that a person needs to move tasks out of the mind by recording them externally, thus freeing the mind from the job of remembering to concentrate on performing tasks, also plays a significant influence on this method. The main obstacle, according to Drucker, still at hand in the work force is the persistence among managers to continue to embrace 20th century management practices instead of adapting to a more modern approach to the current business landscape. The antiquated command and control approach used in past centuries does not work for knowledge workers because the employees themselves own the means of production (their minds). For this reason, the most important people to practice activity management are the senior leaders and management team at a company. The ability to open communications through tracking their own activities for their workforce to view effectively sends a culture message communicated throughout the organization, and helps reinforce the fact that it's the manager's job to lead by example. At PARC, researcher Victoria Bellotti also found that email is the main place where most people do task or activity management.

== Results ==
Properly tracking work activity subsequently acts as a conduit to worker transparency, and the performance data that comes from the tracking of activities gives both employee and supervisors access to updates as well as observe the progress made by workers daily. Being able to track employee work/time on tasks also assists in identifying where improvements can be made along the way. Depending on how tools and software are used to track, project progress could be filtered and viewed by various means, including by total work time spent on or through a detailed timeline displaying the order that work has been done, thus giving an organization different approaches to digesting the data shown as well as an idea of how to properly control project-related costs. The ability to record activities in one centralized area in turn helps reduce time spent among workers on extraneous tasks like drafting an email or physically hunting down a co-worker for the status of an assignment. Having the power to visibly inspect and review the progress of a piece of work is a major influencer of emotions, and gives them not only more positive perceptions of the work itself, but of their colleagues and their organization. In Teresa Amabile and Steven J. Kramer's “The Power of Small Wins,” the two go in depth to enforce the fact that “Of all the things that can boost inner work life, the most important is making progress in meaningful work.” The ability to track and manage activities also carries along with it intrinsic social cues in the workplace. The collection of viewable data for employees makes it easier to define and reinforce acceptable behavior in the workplace, as well as allows supervisors and co-workers to learn what/how their peers think and feel throughout their day.
