= Remember the Milk =

Web-based task- and time-management application

Remember The Milk Inc.
- Developer: Remember the Milk
- Operating system: Cross-platform (Web-based application)
- Type: Electronic calendar, Task Manager, To Do List
- Website: www.rememberthemilk.com

Remember the Milk (RTM) is an application service provider for web-based task and time management services. Launched in 2005, it allows users to manage tasks from a computer or smartphone, both online and offline.

== Features ==
Remember the Milk allows users to create multiple task lists. Added tasks can be edited (or not) to include various fields, locations can be added, and an integrated Google Maps feature allows users to save commonly used locations. Tasks can also be organized by tags. Tasks can be postponed, and Remember the Milk will inform users of the number of times a given task has been postponed.

Remember the Milk offers integration with Gmail, Microsoft Outlook, and SMS. It is a freemium tool, with a free version and a premium version with an annual subscription fee. It is available on Windows, MacOS, iOS, and Android.

== See also ==
- Getting Things Done
- Digital calendar
