= Timeblocking =

Productivity technique

Timeblocking (or time blocking) or time chunking is a productivity technique for personal time management in which a period of time—typically a day or week—is divided into smaller segments or blocks for specific tasks or to-dos. It integrates the function of a calendar with that of a to-do list. It is a form of scheduling.

When done properly, timeblocking can help eliminate distractions and discourage unproductive multitasking.

== History ==
The practice of timeblocking is nearly as old as the use of calendars. Evidence suggests that calendars during the Bronze Age corresponded to a particular agricultural action. This enabled farmers to plant and harvest at the right times, reducing crop spoilage.

As the standard definition of a calendar gradually evolved to the Gregorian one that is widely used today and each unit of time became subdivided into smaller and smaller segments, timeblocking evolved to a more detailed scale.

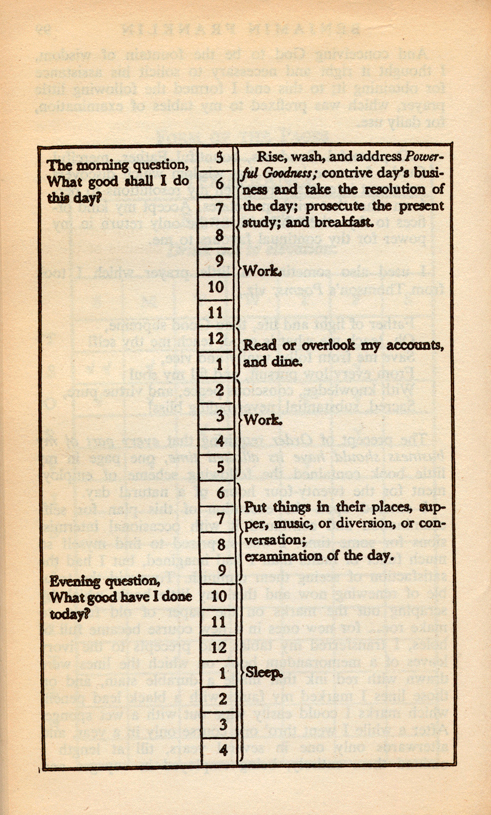
One of the early adopters of timeblocking was Benjamin Franklin

While the first user of timeblocking is unknown, Benjamin Franklin was known to be an early adopter. Franklin avidly detailed the activities he would undertake every hour of the day, including rest and chores. He blocked off hours at a time to engage in deep work and allocated two hours for lunch.

Since the advent of personal digital assistants in the 1990s and later smartphones in the 2000s, timeblocking has transformed from a paper-and-pen format to a digital format in the form of calendaring software and time-tracking software. Digital calendars enable users to share meetings and send meeting invites, furthering collaboration. This has reduced the need for paper calendars, though users still remain.

== Method ==
Time blocking typically begins with identifying the tasks that need to be completed within a day or a week. Each task is given an estimated duration and placed into a specific time slot on a calendar. Similar tasks are often grouped together to maintain focus and reduce context switching. The schedule is adjusted as needed when tasks take longer or shorter than expected. Reviewing the blocks at the end of the day helps refine future planning.

== Benefits ==
Timeblocking aids in daily, weekly, monthly, and yearly planning. It is based on a single-tasking mindset, promoting devoting one's full attention to a task for a specified duration of time. The main benefit of timeblocking is that it helps users achieve more in the same amount of time. Cal Newport, author of Deep Work and assistant professor of computer science at Georgetown University has stated,

Sometimes people ask why I bother with such a detailed level of planning. My answer is simple: it generates a massive amount of productivity. A 40-hour time-blocked work week, I estimate, produces the same amount of output as a 60+ hour work week pursued without structure."

— Cal Newport

Timeblocking can help users be more realistic about what can be accomplished in a day and help them structure their day more productively. Additionally, timeblocking personal time such as breakfast in the morning or vacation time can help alleviate workplace-induced stress. Timeblocking encourages allocating deliberate time away from the desk, reducing the chance of employee burnout. This can help workers feel more rejuvenated and more productive when they are working. Finally, timeblocking creates a sense of artificial urgency to get each task done in a predetermined amount of time which may help some users accomplish more in the same time period, with one study finding that professionals who timeblock accomplish 53% more tasks than otherwise.

== Scientific support ==
Research in productivity and cognitive psychology suggests that working in structured time intervals reduces cognitive load and helps maintain sustained attention. Studies on task planning and focused work also report improvements in accuracy and overall efficiency when individuals use defined time blocks.

== Criticisms ==
David Allen, author of Getting Things Done, once espoused a no-frills approach to calendar organization, advocating for only putting deadlines on calendars. However, in recent years, he has expressed doubts about his previous approach to calendar management, reneging on his previous ideology. In an interview in 2014, he has supported timeblocking by stating, "yesterday I blocked my calendar for two different time slots to work on a project."

== Relationship with other methods ==
- Timeboxing is a variant of timeblocking used in project management.
- The Pomodoro technique is a productivity framework that espouses that professionals should focus without distraction on work for 25 minutes then take a break. Its interval-based technique complements timeblocking, though the Pomodoro technique is more of an ad hoc measure for unspecific work whereas timeblocking is a proactive planning methodology for specific tasks.

== Notable users ==
- Benjamin Franklin timeblocked his day by the hour, allocating time for sleeping, meals, and recreation.
- Jack Dorsey, ex-CEO of Twitter and CEO of Block, Inc., is known to block entire days thematically. He described his schedule as:

On Monday, [..] I focus on management and running the company…Tuesday is focused on product. Wednesday is focused on marketing and communications and growth. Thursday is focused on developers and partnerships. Friday is focused on the company and the culture and recruiting. Saturday I take off, I hike. Sunday is reflection, feedback, strategy, and getting ready for the week.

— Jack Dorsey

- Venture capitalist Marc Andreessen timeblocks free time, "time to think", as well as his sleeping time.
- Cal Newport spends 20 minutes each evening timeblocking his next day. He attributes this to allowing him to focus on "deep pursuits" and achieve more in a day.
- Bill Gates utilizes timeblocking to schedule his day.

== See also ==
- Digital calendar
- Work breakdown structure
