= John Siracusa =

American technology writer and podcaster

- Education: Boston University
- Occupations: Technology writer; software developer; podcaster
- Known for: Mac OS X reviews at Ars Technica; Accidental Tech Podcast
- Website: hypercritical.co

John Siracusa is an American technology writer, software developer, and podcaster. He is best known for his lengthy, in-depth reviews of Apple's Mac OS X (later OS X) operating system, which he wrote for the technology website Ars Technica from 1999 to 2014, and for co-hosting the Accidental Tech Podcast.

== Early life and education ==
Siracusa grew up on Long Island, New York, and earned a Bachelor of Science in computer engineering from Boston University. He worked as a professional web developer while writing for Ars Technica as a freelance contributor.

== Career ==
=== Mac OS X reviews ===
Siracusa wrote his first review of Apple's Mac OS X for Ars Technica in 1999, beginning with the operating system's developer previews, and went on to review every major release through OS X 10.10 Yosemite in 2014. The reviews became known for their length and technical depth; his review of OS X 10.7 Lion ran to some 27,300 words across 19 webpages. The Nieman Lab wrote that the arrival of a new Siracusa review had become "an ancient ritual in the tech world", and described the reviews as "legendary among Mac nerds for their depth, precision, and length."

Beginning with the Lion review in 2011, Ars Technica published the reviews both free on its website and as paid ebooks; the Lion ebook sold several thousand copies in total, and the 2012 Mountain Lion ebook sold 3,000 copies within 24 hours. His review of OS X 10.10 Yosemite, published in October 2014, proved to be his last; in April 2015 he announced that he would not review future versions of OS X for Ars Technica or any other publication, ending a run of roughly 15 years. His retirement was reported as news in the technology press.

=== Podcasting ===
Siracusa co-hosted Hypercritical, a weekly show about Apple and technology, with Dan Benjamin on the 5by5 network from 2011 until its 100th and final episode in December 2012. In 2013, he became a co-host of the Accidental Tech Podcast (ATP), a weekly technology show, alongside developers Marco Arment and Casey Liss. Since 2015 he has also co-hosted Reconcilable Differences with Merlin Mann on the Relay FM network. He co-hosts Robot or Not? with Jason Snell on The Incomparable, where he has been a regular panelist on the network's flagship pop-culture podcast since its 2010 launch. He continues to write at his blog, Hypercritical.

=== Software ===
In addition to writing and podcasting, Siracusa develops macOS utility applications, several of which restore or extend system behaviors he felt were missing from modern versions of the operating system.

His first app, Front and Center, co-developed with Lee Fyock and released in January 2020, lets users control the Mac's window-layering behavior, optionally restoring the classic Mac OS convention in which clicking a window brings all of that application's windows to the front. A month later he released SwitchGlass, a customizable, dedicated application switcher that displays a floating palette of running apps independent of the Dock. Both apps were written to replace features of the discontinued utility DragThing, which stopped working when macOS Catalina dropped support for 32-bit software.

In February 2025 Siracusa released Hyperspace, a utility that reclaims disk space by finding files with identical contents and converting them into APFS clones, eliminating the duplicated data without deleting or moving any files. Later updates extended it to reclaim space from package files, cloud storage, and system library directories.

== Selected works ==
Siracusa's Ars Technica Mac OS X reviews were also published as ebooks by the site's parent company:

- Mac OS X 10.7 Lion: The Ars Technica Review (2011)
- OS X 10.8 Mountain Lion: The Ars Technica Review (2012)
- OS X 10.9 Mavericks: The Ars Technica Review (2013)
- OS X 10.10 Yosemite: The Ars Technica Review (2014)
