= Taskwarrior =

Open-source time and task management tool

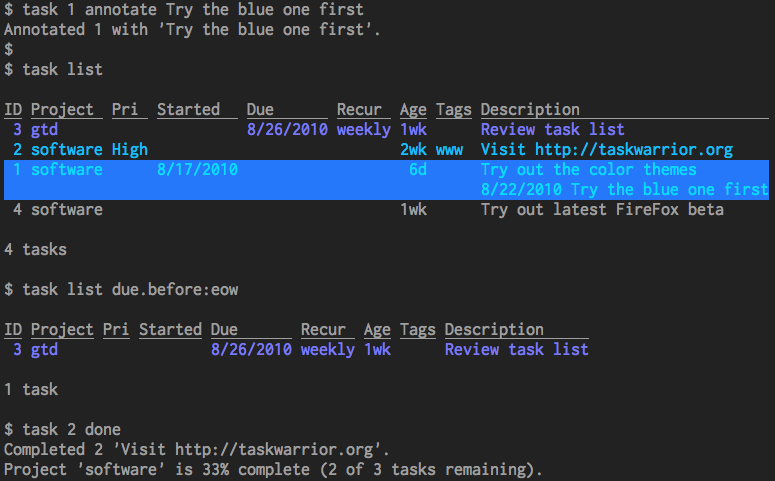
- Taskwarrior 1.9.x demonstrating colored themes
- Original author: Paul Beckingham
- Developers: Renato Alves, Tomas Babej, Paul Beckingham, Federico Hernandez, Dustin J. Mitchell, David J Patrick, Wilhelm Schuermann
- Release: 3 June 2008; 18 years ago
- Stable release: 3.5.0 / 16 August 2026; 28 days ago
- Written in: C++, Rust
- Operating system: Windows (Cygwin), Linux, Mac OS X, BSD
- Available in: English
- Type: Task management, Time management
- License: MIT License
- Website: taskwarrior.org
- Repository: github.com/GothenburgBitFactory/taskwarrior

Taskwarrior is an open-source, cross platform time and task management tool, used to keep track of and handle tasks. It uses a command-line interface, although since its inception, graphical user interface wrappers have also been created.

Taskwarrior uses concepts and techniques described in Getting Things Done by David Allen, but is paradigm-agnostic in that it does not require users to adhere to any given life-management philosophy.

According to its author, Taskwarrior was created "to address layout and feature issues" in the Todo.txt applications popularized by Gina Trapani. The authors offer an accompanying tool called Timewarrior for tracking time spent on projects. Configuration allows e. g. to define recurring breaks such as lunch time. The documentation notes that "Timewarrior focuses on accurately recording time already spent, whereas Taskwarrior looks forward to work that is not yet done."

Taskwarrior's source code is a free and open-source software and can be either compiled from source code to run on a variety of architectures and operating systems, or installed as a binary, which is available on many Linux distribution binary repositories.

== Typical Workflow ==
Taskwarrior comprises three main commands: add, list, and done. All other functionality – recurrences, tags, priorities, etc. – are optional.

=== Adding a task ===
$ task add Pick up keys to the new apartment
Created task 1.

=== Listing Tasks ===
$ task list
ID Project Pri Due Active Age    Description                      
1                         4 secs Pick up keys to the new apartment
1 task

=== Marking a task as completed ===
$ task 1 done
Completed 1 'Pick up keys to the new apartment'.
Marked 1 task as done.

=== Creating a task with due dates, recurrences, and tags ===
$ task add Mow the lawn project:Lawnwork due:tomorrow recur:biweekly +home
Created task 1.

== Syncing ==
When used in conjunction with Taskserver, it can sync tasks into the cloud, and indirectly with other clients/devices. Taskserver was abandoned in 2024 and only works together with Taskwarrior 2.x.

== Accolades ==
- Issue 124 of the UK Linux Format magazine (November 2009) featured Taskwarrior in its Hot Picks section.
- RadioTux Talk #137 (July 2011, German) chose Taskwarrior as Hot Pick
- FLOSS Weekly dedicated episode 175 (July 2011) to Taskwarrior
- Linux Voice featured a tutorial on Taskwarrior

== See also ==
- Comparison of time-tracking software
- Getting Things Done
- Time management
- Task management
- Org-mode
