= Matmice =

Former social networking website

MatMice was a free invite-only social networking website aimed at children and teenagers, founded by three sisters in 2000. Until February 2007, the website based itself on free webpages for children, with basic tools and HTML support, and 1,758,660 members joined, hundreds joining each day.

== History ==
MatMice won numerous awards due to its free to use basis aimed primarily at children, and was recognised as a leader in development of user friendly technology easily accessible to children. Special attention was drawn to the website's achievement of top prize at the Cable & Wireless Childnet Awards. MatMice also had plans to utilize other languages.

In 2003, the oldest of the MatMice creators, Emily Boyd was awarded the NSW Young Australian of the Year and honoured with the Centenary Medal. This award recognises her as making contributions to Australian society or government.

== Closing ==
On September 22, 2008, MatMice officially closed, members had no access to their pages, and were redirected to the main page with the announcement of their closure:

MatMice is now closed. As announced earlier, MatMice closed on Monday September 22, 2008. We started MatMice more than 8 years ago (when we were 16, 14, and 10 years old) so that we could help other kids to make their own homepages. MatMice has been a big part of our lives, but unfortunately the three of us no longer have the time that's needed to keep the site running smoothly or add new stuff. :( We want to say a huge thank you to everyone who's been part of MatMice since we started! - Emily, Sarah, and Elise, MatMice Founders

Emily Boyd is also one of the founders of Remember the Milk.
