= Wil Shipley =

American businessman (born 1969)

William "Wil" Jon Shipley (born October 16, 1969) is a Macintosh software developer, best known for co-founding and heading The Omni Group in 1991, where he did consulting work and developed software for the NeXTSTEP operating system, Rhapsody and later Mac OS X. His firm was one of a relative few to develop for Rhapsody, with the company's OmniWeb becoming the most popular browser for the platform. While at Omni he won a record five Apple Design Awards for his company's products. He went on to found a second notable software firm, Delicious Monster, with Mike Matas in 2004. Delicious Library, the company's flagship product, won three more Apple Design Awards.

In November 2004 he added the ability to scan UPCs to Delicious Library and pioneered the field of computer-based video one-dimensional barcode scanning (previous efforts had not been real-time, taking up to 2 seconds per frame). In 2007 Wil and Lucas Newman wrote a new algorithm that did not require cameras with variable focus lenses, thus pioneering blurry one-dimensional barcode reading ("reverse image deconvolution") using ideas from Belgian astronomers.

He is noted in the Macintosh community for his experience in software usability and design, as well as the Pimp My Code series on his personal weblog, a popular feature where he shares free code examples and tips on programming. In 2005, Shipley gave a talk entitled "How to Succeed Writing Mac Software" at WWDC and in 2007 spoke at C4 about using "the hype machine" to your company's advantage.

On September 27, 2021, Shipley announced on Twitter that he had joined Apple as of that day, as Senior iOS Home Application Engineer.

Shipley was named one of the most influential members of the Mac community by MacTech Magazine in 2006 and 2007. He has appeared in Penny Arcade, a popular webcomic, three times.
