= OmniDiskSweeper =

Disk space analyzer for macOS

- Developer: The Omni Group
- Stable release: 1.16 / September 12, 2025
- Operating system: macOS
- Type: Disk Utility
- License: Freeware
- Website: OmniDiskSweeper

OmniDiskSweeper is a freeware disk space analyzer utility for macOS developed by The Omni Group, which recursively searches the filesystem and displays entries sorted and color-coded by size, from largest to smallest. Alternatives include DaisyDisk and GrandPerspective.

Its interface presents a column view similar to the macOS Finder. OmniDiskSweeper supports internal and external drives, and network volumes. It warns users when selecting files that are required by macOS or by installed applications, but this only works for applications installed with macOS's Installer utility, based on BOM files.

The program was first released in April 2001 as shareware. Early versions required payment to delete files, but users could also delete them manually through the Finder. The Omni Group relicensed it as freeware in 2009, stating a need to refocus on their other programs.

Specialist outlets MacGeneration and Macworld describe it as a basic tool, useful to find large but unused files. The Register gave it a rating of 70/100, and included it in their 2010 selection of free essential Mac apps.
