= Clean Email =

Email sorting software

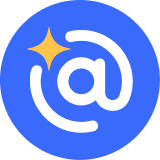
- Developers: Clean Email, LLC
- Release: 2014; 12 years ago
- Operating system: Android, macOS, iOS
- Available in: 6 languages
- List of languages: American English; European French; German; Japanese; Latin American Spanish; Ukrainian
- Type: Email management software
- License: Subscription
- Website: clean.email

Clean Email is an automated software as a service email management application which identifies and clears junk email from inboxes. The service uses a subscription business model with a free trial for the first 1,000 emails. and is available on macOS, iOS, Android, and on the web.

== History ==
Clean Email is a self-funded company headquartered in Los Angeles, California. Initially developed by the founder for personal use, the service was designed to address the growing issue of inbox clutter and privacy concerns.

In 2017, John Gruber recognized Clean Email as a trustworthy alternative to Unroll.me after the latter was found to be selling user data.

== Features ==
Clean Email uses algorithms to identify and categorize emails, enabling users to group, remove, label, and archive email messages in bulk. Its Unsubscriber tool consolidates all subscriptions and newsletters into a single view for quick management, allowing users to bulk unsubscribe or temporarily pause mail.

Its Screener feature transforms the inbox into an "opt-in" system, enabling users to pre-approve mail from new senders. Cleaning Suggestions identifies frequently cleaned mail, recommending actions accordingly. Additional functionalities include automatic deletion of aging emails, delivery of messages to specified folders, and options to mute or block senders.
