= Wojnar =

Wojnar is a Polish surname, a cognate of the German Wagener, literally meaning wheelwright or cartwright in Polish. Feminine forms: archaic: Wojnarowa, Wojnarówna, dialectal: Wojnarka, Wojnarzonka. There are many variants depending from which German dialect and into which Polish dialect the surname was borrowed: Woinar, Woynar, Wojner, Wojnir, Wajnar, Weinar, Wajner, Wayner, Wejner, Weiner, Weyner, Vojnar. Notable people with the surname include:

- Barbara Baran-Wojnar
- Jerzy Wojnar (1930–2005), Polish pilot and luger
- Petr Wojnar (born 1989), Czech footballer
- Theodore J. Wojnar (born 1930), US Coast Guard rear admiral
- William A. Wojnar (born 1951), American classical organist and professor
