= MacHack =

Defunct Macintosh software developers' conference

- Date: 1986–2004
- Location: Ann Arbor, Michigan then Detroit
- Organized by: Expotech, Inc

MacHack was a Macintosh software developers conference first held in 1986 in Ann Arbor, Michigan in partnership with the University of Michigan. The conference was organized and operated by Expotech, Inc. The final (18th) MacHack conference took place on June 19–21, 2003. In 2004 the conference was renamed ADHOC (The Advanced Developers Hands On Conference). 2005 was the last year of the ADHOC conference.

== History ==
The conference was atypical of computer conferences in many ways. Keynotes were generally delivered at midnight. The focus of the conference was less on attending sessions and more on developing "hacks": displays of programming, scripting, configuration, or other techie prowess. Hacks were presented in a raucous Friday night show and recognized at a Saturday banquet. The best-received hacks were those developed on-site during the three-day conference, and those that embodied both remarkable technical skill and utter impracticality. Hacks that were perceived as having some utility value were penalized.

Rather than being held in a vibrant or popular location, the first MacHacks were held in the Holidome in Ann Arbor, Michigan. After a few years, the conference tried one year at what has become known as the MacHack from Hell in Southfield, Michigan. Subsequent MacHacks were held in an indistinct Holiday Inn Fairlane-Dearborn at the corner of the Southfield Freeway and Ford Road in Detroit, Michigan (not far from Ford Headquarters and Greenfield Village in Dearborn, Michigan).

One of the key events each year was Bash Apple, typically involving one or more representatives from Apple taking feedback from the angry mob, at times, for many hours. Jordan Mattson, an Apple representative, who engaged regularly and earnestly made the phrase, "It's all Jordan's fault" became a mantra of MacHack.

The MacHax Group held the First Annual MacHax Group Best Hack Contest at the second MacHack in 1987. The Hack Show generally started at midnight, and ran as late as 6 AM (Eric Raymond in 2000). Prizes were awarded to many of the contestants, generally inexpensive and tangentially related to the name or nature of the hack. Unbeknownst to most of the attendees, a key goal of prize selection was to see just how outrageous items could be and still have contestants being willing to take them home. During the final years, the official and beloved hardware store and key purveyor to the contest organizers was Duke's Hardware in Dearborn. Winners were selected by ballot at lunch later that same day, and awards awarded at dinner. The top prize was the coveted Victor-brand rat trap modified to say "A-trap". A-trap is a reference to the Motorola 68000 A-trap exception mechanism which Apple used to great effect in the creation of Macintosh and provided the foundation for much of the hacking enjoyed by attendees.

MacHack's small, informal ethic, and on-site coding challenges have been carried on by a number of conferences; for example, the C4 conference was explicitly created as an attempt to fill the void left by the end of MacHack.

== Conference mantras ==
- Sleep is for the weak and sickly
- Kill Dean's INITs
- It's all Jordan's fault
- Who makes the rules?
- MARKETING!!!
- 72 Hours Caffeine and Code

== Keynote notables ==
- Doug Clapp
- Scott Knaster - 2002
- Original Macintosh development team reunion: Andy Hertzfeld, Randy Wiggington, Daniel Kottke, Caroline Rose, Jef Raskin and Bill Atkinson - 2001 Scheduled to appear, but unable to attend: Guy "Bud" Tribble, Bruce Horn
- John Warnock
- Cory Doctorow
- Eric Raymond - 2000 "open source sermon"
- Dave Winer
- Andy Ihnatko
- Steve Wozniak - 1997, 2001
- Rob Malda
- Tim O'Reilly - 2002
- Ken Arnold - 2003
- Jordan Hubbard
- Ted Nelson

== Notable hacks ==
=== Incomplete list of 1987 hacks ===
- Animated Icon in Finder by Roy Leban
- HeapInit by Fritz Anderson
- SetPaths by Paul Snively
- The Best Hack Implemented in a Nonexistent Product by Darin Adler, Mitch Adler, Leonard Rosenthal, and Paul Snively. It was written using HyperCard, at the time an unreleased product codenamed WildCard.
- Best Power Hack by Mother Nature and NASA. A lightning strike unexpectedly launched three missiles.

=== 1994 Best Hack ===
- 5th place: Metwowerks New & Improved, an addition to Metrowerks Code Warrior development environment.
- 4th place: Stargate arcade game emulation.
- 3rd place: NewTablet, which turns a Newton into a mouse replacement for a Macintosh.
- 2nd place: POArk, Pong Open Architecture; supports any number of players on different operating systems.
- 1st place and winner of the A-Trap award: FEZ by Doug McKenna, demonstrates an advanced set of ZoomRect techniques.

=== 1998 Best Hack ===
- 6th place: Switcher 98
- 5th place: Spotlight
- 4th place: Phaseshift
- 3rd place: 180 Years of Hack
- 2nd place: OFPong
- 1st place and winner of the A-Trap award: asciiMac by Alexandra Ellwood and Miro Jurisic

=== 1999 Best Hack ===
- 5th place: PatchMaker by Paul Baxter.
- 4th place: MacJive by Ned Holbrook and Jorg Brown.
- 3rd place: Desktop Doubler by Ed Wynne.
- 2nd place: Out of Context Menus by Eric Traut
- 1st place and winner of the A-Trap award: Unfinder by Lisa Lippincott

Complete list of 1999's hacks and a conference report.

=== Incomplete list of 2000 hacks ===
- Doggie-Style Windows (best yoot hack)
- L33t like Jeff K (best OS X hack)
- EtherPEG
- Los Alamos Security
- Monitor Doubler
- Vertigo
- Dock Strip

=== Complete list of 2001 hacks ===
- 99 Bottles Hack
- Airport Radar
- AntiLib
- APLocation
- Apple Turnover
- AquaShade
- AquaWriter
- asciishopsource
- Beeper
- BOFH
- Buzzy
- Carol Goodell's Hack 2001
- Cat Juggler
- CDaemon
- Chia Windows X
- Chris Page's Hacks
- Crrrhaack
- Crypt-Oh
- CSFinalHack Module
- D-Trash
- DarkWaver ƒ
- DFA Doubler
- Dr. Cheshire's PPPoE Server
- DSPanic
- Eudora Stat Server
- F1Hack
- FWMacsBug
- GeniusBar ƒ
- GhostFinder
- GrowBoxDock
- Hackable AirPort Network Seeker
- Heep Peeker ƒ
- HelloTree
- HFS-
- Hunter's Hacks
- iBook turbo switch
- ImageToHtml (transformed an image into an HTML table composed of 1x1 pixel cells)
- iTunes (HACKED)
- iTunes Dock Dance Plugin
- iTunes Remote
- iWake
- Juggler
- Kilroy
- King of Swing
- Light Sleeper
- Mac OS X Patching Docs
- MacCleo
- Max's MADLIB from Hell
- Mentat
- More Prefs 1.0 ƒ
- MrMacintosh
- musicPrompter
- Network Alias
- NotEnoughSecrets
- NQCYA
- OurHack
- PageFido
- Palm Finder 2
- PalmDock
- PaperMaker
- PhaseShiftX
- Pied Piper ƒ
- PigLatin Folder
- pixelZone
- Polyhedra
- Pro Mousing
- pseudoDoc
- Saton Vs. Little Red RidingHood
- Silly String
- Spear Britney
- SpellCompositor
- Talking Steve
- TECalc ƒ
- TEPeste ƒ
- TheWeakestLink
- Throbber
- TiVo for QuickTime TV
- Tricycle (Lego Mindstorm)
- Unprotected Memory
- Useful Hack
- X-Menu 2.0

=== Complete list of 2002 hacks ===
- HaikuReporter
- DockDockGoose
- newstracker
- LCD Degauss
- ClassicEdge
- ACursor
- Carol Goodell Hack 2002
- Xydra 0.1
- TuXin
- Starbanger
- BreakoutLevelEditor
- SlowDown
- Clarus all over
- WatchCow
- Lightnin'
- Dude, You're Getting a DogCow
- VIMim
- iBacklight
- Mr Lo
- Dock&Roll
- Load Minimizer
- Billy Carnage 1.0
- OpenGirL
- Project Mayhem
- Alarm Clock
- The Cat's Meow
- somersault
- Oh What A Hack
- The Iron Hack
- penguin gear (pres)
- Dock Invaders
- AniMac
- MOOF through the ROOF
- Airport Security 2002
- Shard
- aurport extender blender
- lcdSTAT!
- Ye Olde Movie
- Metadata
- airmoof
- Utility Scoring Stye (pres)
- Little Brother
- Mike's Moof
- 3DogCow
- VideoFinder (not on CD)
- Jini Network Technology
- iMovie Hack
- Mac Enforcer
- JITObjectiveC
- InformedChoiceChooserFacelft
- nocat
- mosaiHack
- JNib
- iMenu
- APPLE VIDEO SAVER
- SleepItemsX
- DogcowMenu
- IconHunter IV ƒ
- Depth Perception
- Claris Coaster
- RCX Remote Control
- FireStarter
- dukeshardware.com
- HandMatrix
- OldSchoolEdit

=== Complete list of 2003 hacks ===
- Editable SPOD
- Jet Lag
- Haunter
- Sparkie
- Unstoppable Progress: Causes a progress bar to be filled with water.
- Desktop Control Panel Extension
- Secret Life of Apple Logo
- Stinkin Badges
- SPOD was here
- EdgeWarp
- DADEL
- GUI Kablooie
- AirPong
- ClickAndAHalf
- warphack
- underthedesktop
- DecryptErrorMessage
- FishEyeMenus
- Antiqualc
- SetiMonitor
- X-MENu 2 Unexpected End of File
- WTA Death Watch
- wait
- CyberCat
- Interface UnBuilder
- QTJGrab
- Script Adventure
- MagicLocalizer
- GLCheat
- iPod Adventure
- Spinning Clock of Death
- Cocoa DocTour
- Desktop Control Panel Extension
- Size Doesn't Matter
- The Boot
- mountxml
- iTunes Control
- iTunes Location Launcher
- Gnomes
- SEV
- iAnalyseThis
- MoodRing
- Packetplay
- Packet the Magic Dragon
- spuds
- alCrashda
- iPodRip was built at MacHack but not demonstrated as a hack

=== Incomplete list of 2004 hacks ===
- BadBadThing
- EtherPEGCocoa - A program that showed any JPEG images coming across the network (even by other users) in a window. A screensaver version was also produced.
- EULB Extension Program - A program that simulates a 2004-era iBook logic board error that results in screen flashing on Macs that don't have that issue.
- ExposéHopper - Turn on Expose and jump from window to window with a little figure.
- FrodoFinder
- Magic 8 Ball
- MailToOnCrash
- MegaManEffect - Shows the mega man intro whenever you start an application
- Neko Returns
- NotTheSameOldTrash
- Rumor Mill
- Scroll Plate - Hold a paper plate with an up-pointing red or down-pointing green arrow on it in front of the webcam and your Mac will scroll in that direction.
- SmartMouth
- SpellingB
- Stupid Shell Tricks 2004 - A bunch of shell scripts that do fun things, like one that would open/close the CD tray on Macs in the next room in a choreography.
- Talkicity - An app that used various Talking Moose animations and ran a conversation between them in a window.
- Temporary Items
- Unsummarize - A service plugin that takes a piece of text and makes it longer, seemingly doing the reverse of the system's "summarize" service.

== See also ==
- C4 (conference)
