= Order (virtue) =

Order is the planning of time and organizing of resources, as well as of society.

Although orderliness is rarely discussed as a virtue in contemporary society, order is central to improving efficiency, and is at the heart of time management strategies such as David Allen's Getting Things Done.

== Emergence ==
The valorisation of order in the early stages of commercialization and industrialisation was linked by R. H. Tawney to Puritan concerns for system and method in 17th-century England. The same period saw English prose developing the qualities Matthew Arnold described as "regularity, uniformity, precision, balance".

"Let all your things have their places; let each part of your business have its time" is a saying attributed to Benjamin Franklin in 1730, while he was 20 years old. It was one of his 13 virtues.

A darker view of the early modern internalisation of order and discipline was taken by Michel Foucault in The Order of Things and Discipline and Punish; but for Rousseau love of order both in nature and in the harmonious psyche of the natural man was one of the tap-roots of moral conscience.

== Romantic reaction ==
The Romantic reaction against reason, industry, and the sober virtues led to a downgrading of order as well. In art, spontaneity took precedence over method and craft; in life, the Bohemian call of wildness and disorder eclipsed the appeal of ordered sobriety – as with the cultivated disorganization of the 1960s hippie.

"Latter-day attempts such as those of Deidre McCloskey to reclaim the bourgeois virtues like order may be met in some quarters only by laughter."

== Sociology ==
Sociologists—while noting that praise of order is generally associated with a conservative stance – one that can be traced back through Edmund Burke and Richard Hooker to Aristotle—point out that many taken-for-granted aspects of social order (such as which side of the road to drive on) produce substantial and equitable advantages for individuals at very little personal cost. Conversely, breakdowns in public order reveal everyone's daily dependence upon the smooth functioning of the wider society.

Durkheim saw anomie as the existential reaction to the ordered disorder of modern society.

== Psychology ==
Jungians considered orderliness (along with restraint and responsibility) as one of the virtues attributable to the senex or old man—as opposed to the spontaneous openness of the puer or eternal youth.

Freud saw the positive traits of orderliness and conscientiousness as rooted in anal eroticism.

== 20th-century examples ==
Freud himself was a highly organised personality, ordering his life – at work and play – with the regularity of a timetable.

William Osler was another highly successful physician who built his life on a highly organised basis.

== Culture ==
Wallace Stevens wrote of the "blessed rage for order" in Ideas of Order (1936).

== See also ==
- Conscientiousness – Personality trait of being orderly and following the rules
- Convention – Set of agreed, stipulated, or generally accepted standards
- Norm – Informal understanding of acceptable conduct
- Prudence – Ability of a person to regulate themselves with the use of reason
- Temperance – Cardinal virtue of control over excess
