= IRip =

IPod recovery software

iRip
- Developer: The Little App Factory
- Stable release: 2.1 (Mac) (May 6, 2011; 14 years ago) [±] 1.0.1.25 (Windows) (8 April 2010; 15 years ago) [±]
- Operating system: Mac OS X, Windows XP, Windows Vista, Windows 7
- Type: Data recovery software
- License: Proprietary
- Website: thelittleappfactory.com/irip/

iRip (formerly named iPodRip, renamed due to iPod trademark) is a commercial iPod recovery tool for Mac OS X, Windows XP and Windows Vista. It features an iTunes style interface, iPod media transfer, and integration with iTunes. It was originally released in August 2003 and has since had over 5 million downloads.

iRip supports all iPods (including iPod Touch) and all iPhones.

It was developed for the Hack Show during MacHack 2003. However, the developer never demonstrated it thinking the hack "too simple" when compared to Unstoppable Progress and Interface UnBuilder, both of which wowed the audience.

== Name change ==
In November 2009 The Little App Factory was forced by Apple to change the name of iPodRip to remove the trademark iPod. In a bid to gain leniency the developer sent an email to Steve Jobs and this email exchange was leaked garnering headlines due to Steve's succinct reply of "Change your apps name. Not that big of a deal." The software is now known as iRip.

== E-Sports Support ==
In 2010, iRip was a sponsor for some e-sports events.

== See also ==
- Comparison of iPod managers

== Books that Reference iRip ==
- Biersdorfer, J.D. (March 2005). David Pogue (ed.). IPod & ITunes: The Missing Manual, Third Edition. Pogue Press (O'Reilly). p. 59. ISBN 0-596-00877-5.
- Biersdorfer, J.D. (February 2, 2004). David Pogue (ed.). IPod & ITunes: The Missing Manual, Second Edition. Pogue Press (O'Reilly). p. 57. ISBN 0-596-00658-6.
- Bove, Tony (October 2, 2003). The iPod Companion. Boston, MA: Muska & Lipman. p. 186. ISBN 1-59200-113-0.
- Hart-Davis, Guy (April 1, 2004). How to Do Everything with Your iPod & iPod Mini, Second Edition. McGraw-Hill Publishing Co. ISBN 0-07-225452-1.
- Mansfield, Richard (October 2005). Savvy Guide to Digital Music. Indy-Tech Publishing. p. 61. ISBN 0-7906-1317-4.
- Stern, Hadley (October 13, 2004). iPod and iTunes Hacks: Tips and Tools for Ripping, Mixing and Burning. O'Reilly Media, Inc. p. 174. ISBN 0-596-00778-7.
