= Mike Matas =

American user interface designer and icon artist

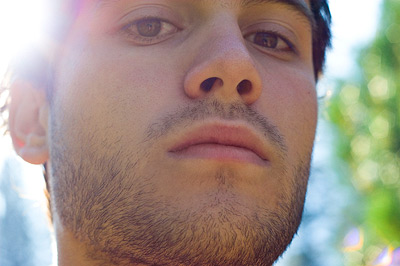
- Matas, July 2007
- Born: March 23, 1986 (age 40); Seattle, Washington, United States
- Other name: Michael Matas
- Occupation: User interface designer
- Employer: LoveFrom

Michael Matas (born March 23, 1986) is an American user interface designer.

Matas has worked at The Omni Group doing interface and graphic design work. He later co-founded Delicious Monster with Wil Shipley.

In 2005, he joined Apple and designed interfaces for Mac OS X, iPhone, and iPad.

After Apple, Matas worked on the team that designed the Nest Learning Thermostat.

Matas later co-founded Push Pop Press, a digital publishing company, with Kimon Tsinteris. Its first and only title was Al Gore's Our Choice in 2004. The company was acquired by Facebook in 2011, where Matas worked on the team that developed Facebook Paper and Facebook Instant Articles.

Matas founded Lobe.ai with Adam Menges, and Markus Beissinger. Lobe.ai was acquired by Microsoft in September 2018.

In October 2021, Matas announced he had joined LoveFrom, the design firm from Jony Ive and Marc Newson.
