= The Omni Group =

American software company

- Company type: Private
- Industry: Computer software
- Founded: 1989
- Headquarters: Seattle, Washington, U.S.
- Key people: Ken Case, Tim Wood
- Products: macOS software, see #Products, below
- Website: omnigroup.com

The Omni Group is an American software company that develops software for the macOS, iOS, and watchOS platforms. The Omni Group was informally founded as a NEXTSTEP consulting company in 1989 by Wil Shipley, who immediately brought on Ken Case and Tim Wood. The three incorporated together under the name Omni Development, Inc. in 1993, because the name "Omni Group" was taken by another Seattle firm. Omni initially produced custom database software for the NEXTSTEP platform for clients such as the William Morris Agency and McCaw Cellular Communications (then Cingular Wireless; now AT&T Inc.). During this period they also ported a number of games to NEXTSTEP, then later to Mac OS X (after Apple acquired NeXT in 1997). Around 2000 the company decided to start focusing on their own consumer applications for the Mac, and as of 2004 the vast majority of their revenue came from their consumer products.

In 2003, Ken Case took over as the chief officer of Omni, and in March 2004 Wil Shipley left with another Omni employee, interface designer Mike Matas, to form Delicious Monster. Matas later left for Apple.

The Omni Group also administers several mailing lists related to macOS and software development. They also provide several frameworks for Cocoa software development under an open source license.

OmniGraffle and OmniOutliner have won Macworld Editors' Choice Awards. At the Macintosh Worldwide Developers Conference in 2001, OmniWeb 4.0 won two Apple Design Awards: "Best Mac OS X User Experience" and "Best New Mac OS X Product."

In 2002, OmniGraffle 2.0 won two more Apple Design Awards.

== Products ==
=== Productivity ===
- OmniDazzle
- OmniDictionary: a discontinued dictionary app that uses the DICT protocol.
- OmniDiskSweeper
- OmniGraffle
- OmniGraphSketcher
- OmniOutliner
- OmniPlan
- OmniPresence: folder syncing via OmniSync or WebDAV server
- OmniWeb
- OmniFocus

=== Frameworks ===
The Omni Group uses many frameworks in their applications, and releases them under an open source license. Most of the frameworks are dependent on the macOS platform, and require Xcode 2.3 and thus Tiger.

- OmniAppKit
- OmniBase
- OmniFoundation
- OmniHTML
- OmniNetworking
- Omni Web Framework

=== Games ===
As users of a platform that was not targeted by commercial porting houses, the Omni Group historically did source ports of games for NeXTStep/OpenStep pro bono, especially maintenance updates of id games. They continued to do so during the transition through Rhapsody into macOS, catching the eye of the existing Macintosh games industry in the process, and were then contracted to port a number of games commercially.

- Activision Anthology Remix
- Alchemy Deluxe
- Aliens versus Predator 2
- Big Money! Deluxe
- Doom
- Doom II: Hell on Earth
- Fallout
- Fallout 2
- Freedom Force
- Giants: Citizen Kabuto
- Heavy Metal: F.A.K.K.²
- Incoming
- No One Lives Forever 2: A Spy in H.A.R.M.'s Way
- Oni (Cocoa)
- Quake
- Quake II
- Quake III: Arena
- Soldier of Fortune II: Double Helix
