= Merlin Mann =

American blogger (born 1966)

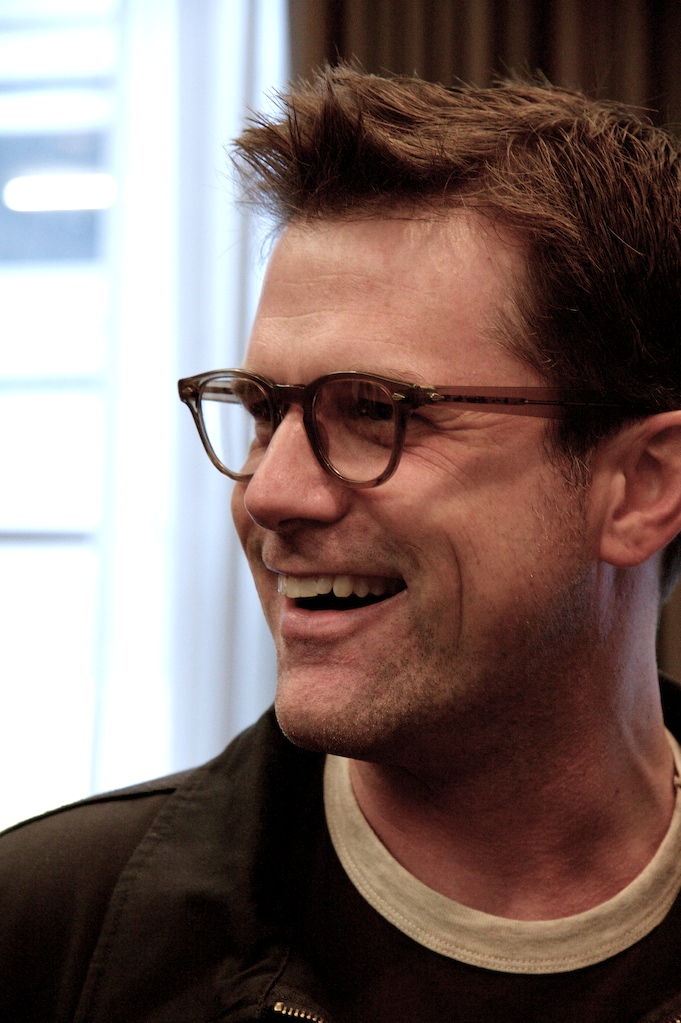
- Merlin Mann at WWDC 2007
- Born: Merlin Dean Mann III; November 26, 1966 (age 59); Cincinnati, Ohio, U.S.
- Education: New College of Florida (BA)
- Occupations: Writer, blogger, podcaster
- Children: 1
- Website: www.merlinmann.com

Merlin Dean Mann III (born November 26, 1966) is an American writer, blogger, and podcaster.

== Early life and education ==
Mann was born Merlin Dean Mann III on November 26, 1966, in Cincinnati, Ohio. Mann received a B.A. from New College of Florida.

== Career ==
=== Writing ===
In September 2004, Mann founded and began the exclusive writing for 43 Folders, a blog about "finding the time and attention to do your best creative work." The blog was last updated October 2011. Mann coined and popularized the concept of "Inbox Zero", writing a series of articles in 2006 on 43 Folders, originally suggesting for an "Inbox DMZ". Inbox Zero became associated with the Getting Things Done productivity strategy, and is a popular topic on Lifehacker. In 2020 Mann stated he doesn't keep his inbox empty, and that the term has been misunderstood.

Beginning in the mid-2000s, Mann wrote articles for Macworld, Make (the "Life Hacks" series, with Danny O'Brien, February 2005 to November 2006), and Popular Science (Ask a Geek series, 2005 to 2007).

On August 18, 2009, Mann announced that he was writing a book, to be entitled Inbox Zero, about "how to reclaim your email, your attention, and your life." In 2011, he announced that he was abandoning the project. Mann also writes for his personal blog, Kung Fu Grippe.

=== Podcasting ===
As a companion to the 43 Folders blog, Mann launched the sporadically broadcast 43 Folders podcast in 2005. In 2007, Mann launched You Look Nice Today, an award-winning comedy podcast that bills itself as "A Journal of Emotional Hygiene", an effort he created with Adam Lisagor and Scott Simpson. The show's run ended in 2015, but a spiritual successor called California King was created in its wake in 2020 with the same team. Mann has also produced QPR: Quotidian Public Radio, an audio podcast launched in January 2009, which was billed as "audio comfort food for annoyed liberals in fleece". Mann was one of the hosts on the MacBreak video podcast, and a core host on the MacBreak Weekly audio podcast. Since 2008, he has scaled back his appearances on the series.

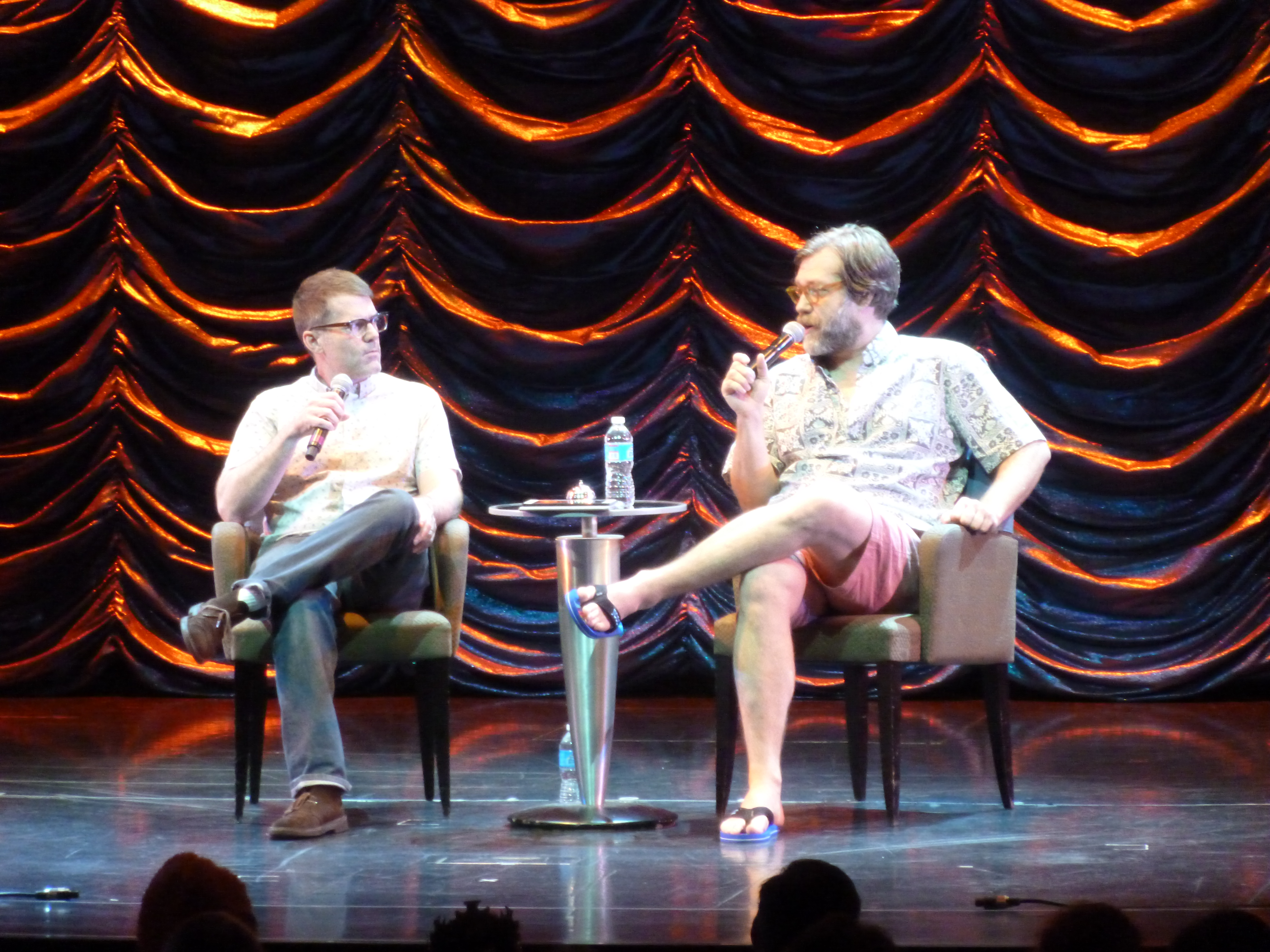
Merlin Mann and John Roderick

Beginning on January 18, 2011, Mann has co-hosted the weekly Back to Work podcast with Dan Benjamin on 5by5, where they discuss subjects like productivity, work life, and true costs of doing business. In September 2011, Mann launched Roderick on the Line, a weekly conversation with musician/writer John Roderick.

In May 2015, Mann and technology blogger Jim Dalrymple started The Dalrymple Report podcast, more recently presented as "The Dalrymple Report with Merlin Mann", which continued through its 32nd episode on September 15, 2015. In June 2015, Mann began a 10 podcast series with John Siracusa in collaboration with Relay FM called Reconcilable Differences, which has since been extended. In October 2016, Mann began a podcast titled Do By Friday with Alex Cox and Max Temkin. The show continued after Temkin's June 2020 departure.

Mann has also appeared as a guest on other podcasts, including the CBC radio show–podcast Spark, The Chronicle of Higher Education's ProfHacker, Scruffy Thinking, CMD+SPACE, and various episodes of Dan Benjamin's The Conversation.

=== Reception and influence ===
Mann became associated with the mid-2000s "life hacking" and personal-productivity movement that grew up around technology blogging. He was quoted in journalist Clive Thompson's October 2005 New York Times Magazine feature on the movement, "Meet the Life Hackers". Writer Cal Newport later characterized Mann as a spokesperson of the tech-driven self-improvement movement of that era, writing that his blog 43 Folders offered knowledge workers a path through information overload.

Mann's productivity writing was credited as an influence by figures outside the technology world. In a 2008 Slate article on presidential productivity, political journalist John Dickerson wrote that he had adopted Mann's approach to managing email and quoted his advice; Dickerson later referenced Mann in his 2020 book on the U.S. presidency, The Hardest Job in the World. Actor and comedian Rob Corddry discussed Mann's work and his own use of Mac productivity tools during a 2012 Macworld panel appearance alongside Mann.

=== Videos ===
In early 2009, Mann produced a short video series, Most Days. On February 26, 2007, Mann launched The Merlin Show, a video podcast primarily dedicated to long-form interviews. Mann has also published a long-running series of video shorts named That Phone Guy.

=== Other work ===
Mann has been described as the "inventor" of the Hipster PDA, a paper-based, DIY personal organizer that uses design cues found in David Allen's Getting Things Done. Mann is also known for his work with Quicksilver, a program used for quickly executing actions from the keyboard in macOS.

Mann was a member of the Tallahassee, Florida-based indie rock band Bacon Ray from 1994 to 1999. He started a cover song project of Will Oldham's song "I Am a Cinematographer".

== Personal life ==
Mann started treatment for attention deficit disorder in 2008, something which he says helped his focus. He occasionally talks about his experiences with ADHD on his Back to Work podcast on the 5by5 network.

Mann resides in San Francisco, California, with his wife and child.
