= MediaMan =

- Developer: He Shiming
- Release: March 9, 2004
- Stable release: 3.10.1105 / November 30, 2010; 15 years ago
- Written in: C++ / WTL / skia / Chromium Embedded Framework
- Operating system: Microsoft Windows
- Available in: English / Japanese
- Type: Home Hobby / Cataloging
- License: Commercial
- Website: http://www.imediaman.com/

MediaMan is a general purpose collection organizer software for establishing a personal database of media collections (DVDs, CDs, books, etc.) developed by He Shiming.

Debuted in 2004 as freeware, MediaMan was the first software in its genre to offer a media-agnostic, general purpose organization software. The license of MediaMan remained freeware, until late 2006 when it switched to a price of $39.95 per license.

Amazon Web Services (later called E-Commerce Service and Product Advertising API) was used to retrieve product information automatically during the import process in MediaMan, which means it is also a part of the Amazon Associates program. However, the latest version of MediaMan (v3.10 series) no longer uses this API due to the efficiency guidelines introduced in October 2010.

MediaMan is also known as a Windows alternative to Mac OS X's Delicious Library.

Software development seems to have stalled with the last release of a beta of MediaMan 4.0 back in December 2013. There have been a growing number of bugs in the software that has made the program unusable for some. Communications with the developer have stopped, development and bug fixes have ceased, and the site has gone offline.

== Product history ==
| Date | Version | Major features | License |
|---|---|---|---|
| 2004.3 | 0.8 | Initial public release | Freeware |
| 2004.6 | 1.0 | Import from 6 Amazon sites, status tracking | Freeware |
| 2004.8 | 1.5 | 4-style item listing | Freeware |
| 2005.1 | 2.0 | Virtual-Shelf, theme, webcam barcode scanning | Freeware |
| 2005.9 | 2.30 | Enhanced virtual-shelf, theme, performance | Freeware |
| 2006.10 | 2.65 | Switched to SQLite for file format, rewritten GUI | Shareware |
| 2007.8 | 2.70 | Playback of audio/video inside program | Shareware |
| 2008.9 | 3.0 | Complete rewrite to improve experience and performance | Shareware |
| 2010.10 | 3.10 | Complete rewrite to further improve user experience, adopted Chromium style GUI | Shareware |

== See also ==
- Delicious Library
