= Alan Lakein =

American writer

- Born: 1938 (age 87–88); United States
- Education: Johns Hopkins University; Harvard Business School
- Occupation: Author

Alan Lakein is an American author on personal time management, including How to Get Control of Your Time and Your Life which has sold over 3 million copies.

Lakein graduated from Johns Hopkins University and Harvard Business School and resides in Santa Cruz, California.

Lakein is credited for several quotes, including "Time = Life, Therefore, waste your time and waste your life, or master your time and master your life." He is credited as the creator of Lakein's question: "What is the best use of my time right now?". He has also made management films and training films.

Former U.S. President Bill Clinton started his autobiography, My Life, with a reference to the book:

When I was a young man just out of law school and eager to get on with my life, on a whim I briefly put aside my reading preference for fiction and history and bought one of those how-to books: How to Get Control of Your Time and Your Life, by Alan Lakein. The book's main point was the necessity of listing short-, medium-, and long-term life goals, then categorizing them in order of their importance, with the A group being the most important, the B group next, and the C the last, then listing under each goal specific activities designed to achieve them. I still have that paperback book, now almost thirty years old. And I'm sure I have that old list somewhere buried in my papers, though I can't find it. However, I do remember the A list. I wanted to be a good man, have a good marriage and children, have good friends, make a successful political life, and write a great book.

== Books ==
- Alan Lakein, How to Get Control of Your Time and Your Life (1973, New American Library, New York City; ISBN 0-451-13430-3)
- Alan Lakein, Give Me a Moment and I'll Change Your Life: Tools for Moment Management (1997 Andrews & McMeel, Kansas City, MO; ISBN 0-8362-3591-6)
- It's About Time & It's About Time (1975)
