= OmniGraphSketcher =

- Developer: The Omni Group
- Initial release: March 2009; 16 years ago
- Operating system: macOS, iOS
- Type: Charting software
- License: Open-source (since 2014)
- Website: GitHub repository

OmniGraphSketcher was a software application from The Omni Group for creating quantitative diagrams. It allowed users to plot data and draw freehand curves, filled areas, and text labels on a coordinate plane. It was available from March 2009 through July 2013.

== History ==
OmniGraphSketcher had its origins in Graph Sketcher, a Mac OS X application created by Robin Stewart that was first commercially released in 2006. The software was influenced by Stewart's academic research integrating data plotting with freehand illustration user interfaces.

The Omni Group acquired Graph Sketcher in 2008 and launched OmniGraphSketcher for Mac in March 2009, followed by an iPad version in April 2010.

In July 2013, the Omni Group discontinued OmniGraphSketcher, and in January 2014 released its source code under an open-source license as GraphSketcher.

== Reception ==
Outlets such as Macworld, MacUser, and MacNN described OmniGraphSketcher as "one of those programs that does one thing and does it very well." Most rated it 4/5, appreciating the simplicity of making graphs but noting some limitations and interface glitches with the iPad version.
