= Ben Thompson (analyst) =

American business, technology, and media analyst

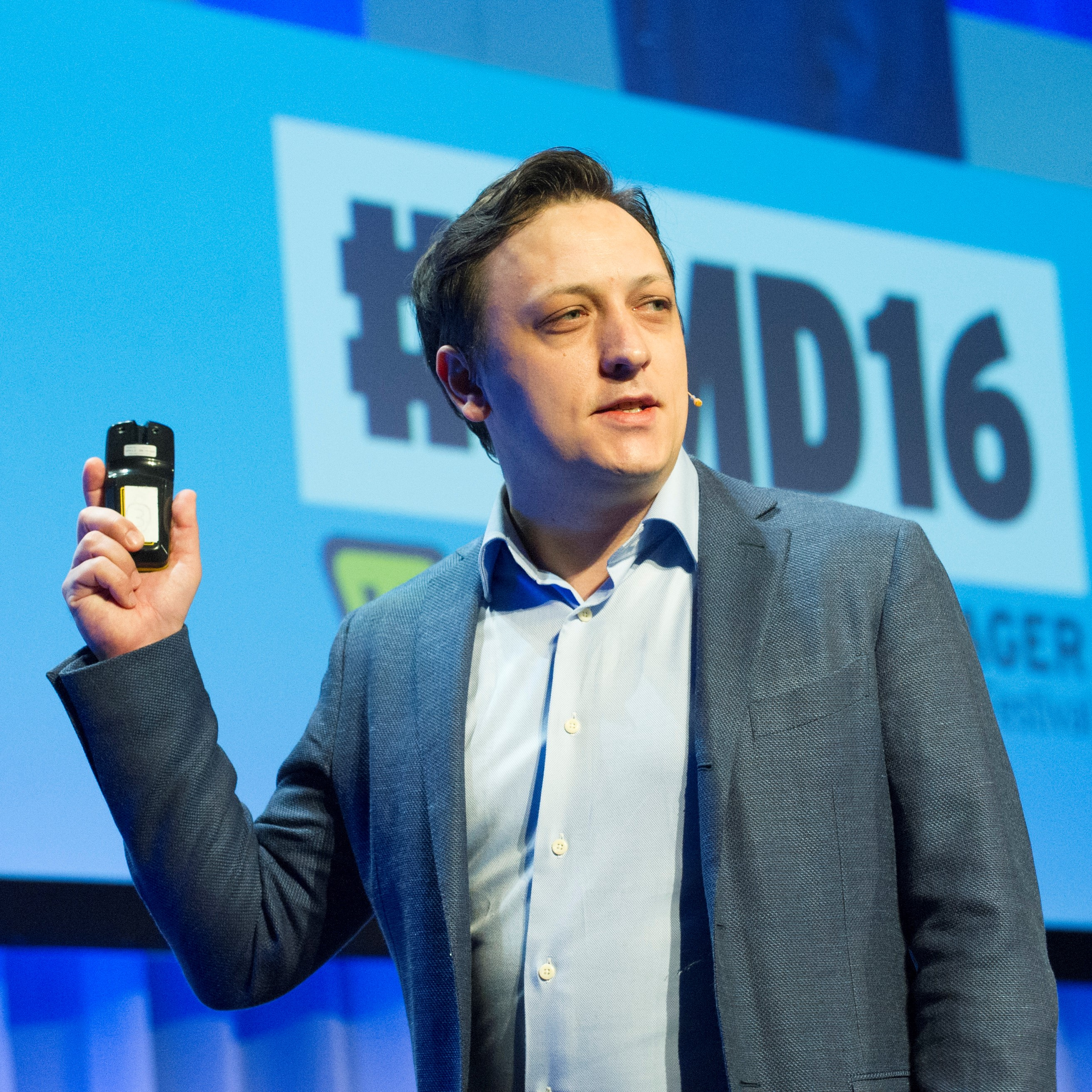
- Thompson in 2016
- Education: University of Wisconsin–Madison; Northwestern University (MBA, MEM)
- Occupations: Business, technology, and media analyst

Ben Thompson is an American business, technology, and media analyst who lived in Taipei, where he founded Stratechery, a subscription-based newsletter/podcast featuring commentary on tech and media news, and co-hosts tech podcasts Sharp Tech with Andrew Sharp, Dithering with John Gruber and Exponent with James Allworth, respectively.

== Education ==
Thompson's undergraduate education was at the University of Wisconsin–Madison, and his graduate education at Northwestern University, where he received a Master of Business Administration from the Kellogg School as well as a Master of Engineering Management from the McCormick School of Engineering.

== Career ==
Thompson's career includes stints at Apple, where he interned at Apple University; Microsoft, where he worked on its Windows Apps team; and at WordPress developer Automattic as a growth engineer.

== Stratechery ==
Thompson launched Stratechery as a blog while still a Microsoft employee, and in April 2014 devoted himself to the site full-time, operating on a "freemium" subscription model. He has stated his primary inspiration was John Gruber, author of the site Daring Fireball.

As of April 2015, Thompson had more than 2,000 paying subscribers. By 2017, Recode described Stratechery as having pioneered the paid newsletter business model. The founders of Substack, a newsletter platform launched in 2018, called Thompson a major inspiration for their project.

== Aggregation theory ==
Thompson is a proponent of aggregation theory, which describes how platforms (i.e. aggregators such as Google and Facebook) come to dominate the industries in which they compete in a systematic and predictable way. Aggregators have all three of the following characteristics:

- direct relationship with users;
- zero marginal costs for serving users;
- and demand-driven multi-sided networks with decreasing acquisition costs.

== Personal life ==
In August 2025, Thompson relocated from Taiwan back to the United States.
