= MarsEdit =

Blog editing software for macOS

- MarsEdit 5 running on macOS Ventura
- Developer: Red Sweater Software
- Stable release: 5.0.1 / December 13, 2022; 3 years ago
- Operating system: macOS
- Type: Blog client
- License: Proprietary
- Website: red-sweater.com/marsedit

MarsEdit is a blog post editor for the Mac made by Red Sweater Software. It can be used to write, edit, and publish blog posts, and supports many popular blogging services, such as WordPress, Tumblr, Blogger, and Movable Type.

== History ==
MarsEdit was originally developed by Brent Simmons as a component of NetNewsWire, a popular news aggregator for Mac OS X, which, in the 1.0 series, included a simple weblog editor. During the development of NetNewsWire 2.0, the developers decided to move the blog editor functionality to a new application.

With the acquisition of NetNewsWire by NewsGator in 2005, the future of MarsEdit was uncertain for a time. Simmons considered abandoning the app, or open-sourcing it to let other developers work on it, but after a "strong reaction from users", he announced at the October 2005 DrunkenBlog conference that development would continue. On November 4 of 2005, he revealed that MarsEdit development would be continued by Gus Mueller of Flying Meat. In February 2007, MarsEdit was purchased by Red Sweater Software, and development was taken over by Red Sweater's owner, Daniel Jalkut.

Support for the popular Tumblr blog service was added to MarsEdit 2.3 after Jalkut worked with Tumblr developer Marco Arment.

In 2010, an iOS version was planned, but was not released.

In 2018, MarsEdit creator Daniel Jalkut co-formed a group called the "Developer Union" protesting Apple's developer policies. He had previously complained about the Mac App Store taking away developers' control over their app sales.

MarsEdit joined the Setapp subscription package in 2019.

== Reception ==
Reviews of initial versions of MarsEdit were positive, but pointed out bugs. Version 2 received a 4 out of 5 star review by Macworld magazine, while Ars Technica's David Chartier said it lacked ecto's support for Amazon affiliate links and the built-in Mac OS X Media Browser. In 2007, Engadget's Scott McNulty called it "fantastic" in comparison to Blogger's web interface, and Ars Technica's Jacqui Cheng described it as a "popular blogging tool among Mac users". Scott Gilbertson noted that the app was popular among "a number of" writers for Wired magazine. Weighing the need for MarsEdit compared to using Tumblr's web interface, Christina Warren said that the lower risk of data loss (through saved drafts) and the ease of writing long posts made the app "superior". Macworld praised the new WYSIWYG features in version 3.1, but noted that there was missing documentation for self-hosted Movable Type blogs. In 2018, Macworld gave version 4.1 their Editor's Choice award, and rated it 4.5 out of 5 stars; AppleInsider was also positive. In December 2022, Apple blogger John Gruber called it "essential for [his] work".

== Release history ==
Version	Release date	Changes
1.0	December 10, 2004	Initial version; Support for drafts, custom templates, AppleScript, custom HTML tags, spell checking
1.1	March 2006	
2.0	September 2006	Flickr integration to pick photos that can be added to blog posts; A Markup dropdown menu that automatically generates HTML syntax (with support for custom keyboard-triggered macros); Improved user interface, which dropped the drawers and pinstripes common among early Aqua user interfaces; WYSIWYG preview window before publishing a post
2.0.4	November 2007	Bug fixes
2.1	January 2008	Tagging support for Movable Type and WordPress; Support for uploading drafts to blogging services; Search bar returns drafts and published posts
2.2	July 2008	Support for the AtomPub protocol; More advanced image markup options
2.3	March 2009	Support for posting to Tumblr
3.0	May 2010	WYSIWYG editing through a rich text editor, to avoid the need to write HTML code; HTML syntax highlighting; Scheduled uploads; Image library integration for iPhoto, Aperture, Lightroom; Support for WordPress static pages
3.1	September 2010	
3.4	November 2011	Improved media manager
3.5.6	September 2012	Reinstated Tumblr support after a server-side change had made the app incompatible; Integration with OS X Mountain Lion's Notification Center
4.0	February 2018	Support for sandboxing, autosave, and versioning; New Safari extension; "Typewriter-style" focused writing mode; Customizable article author name
4.5	September 2021	Media Manager now syncs with WordPress
5.0	December 2022	Support for Markdown highlighting; New app icon; New Micropost floating panel that can be activated with a systemwide keyboard shortcut, where users can type short posts and instantly publish; WYSIWYG Markdown syntax highlighting
