= GrandPerspective =

MacOS disk usage analysis software

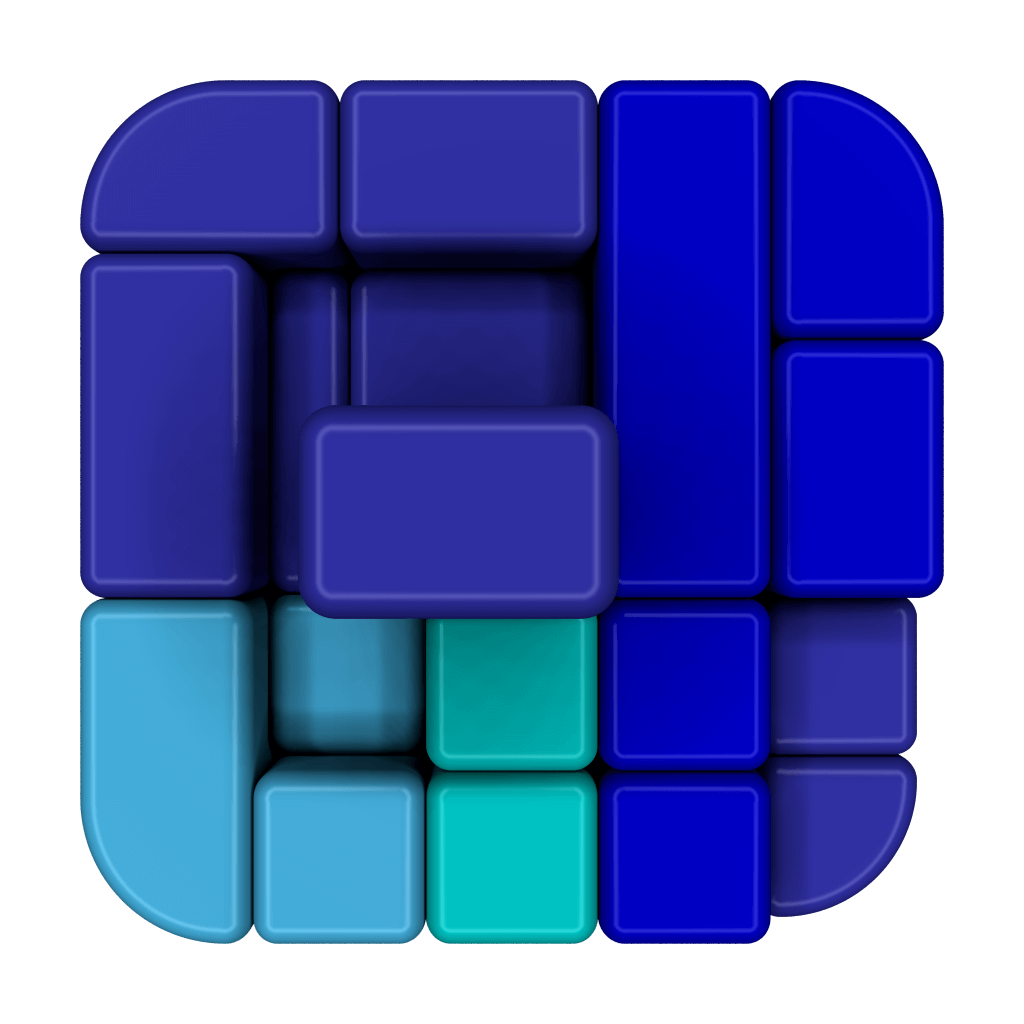
- Developer: Erwin Bonsma
- Release: September 20, 2005
- Stable release: 3.6.3 / January 24, 2026; 4 months ago
- Operating system: macOS
- Type: Disk Utility
- License: GNU GPL
- Website: grandperspectiv.sourceforge.net

GrandPerspective is open source software for macOS used for disk space analysis in a graphical treemap. In 2010, the application was ranked at number six on Cult of Mac's "50 Mac Essentials" list. In December 2020, GrandPerspective, with its latest version at the time, released a new application icon in accordance with the macOS Big Sur app icon guidelines.
