= Delicious Monster =

American software company

Delicious Monster Software
- Type: LLC
- Industry: Software
- Founded: November 2004
- Headquarters: 6252 34th Avenue NE; Seattle, WA 98115-7311
- Key people: Wil Shipley
- Products: Mac OS X software: Delicious Library
- Number of employees: 3
- Website: www.delicious-monster.com

Delicious Monster is a software company based in Seattle, Washington, that sells the shareware software program Delicious Library. Its founders are Wil Shipley, one of the three co-founders of The Omni Group, and Mike Matas, who worked as an interface designer at The Omni Group. Matas left Delicious Monster in 2005 to work for Apple, but left the company in July 2009 to found Push Pop Press.

The company's name is based on the name of a plant that grows in the rainforests of tropical America, Monstera deliciosa. It is colloquially known as the Swiss cheese plant.

Wil Shipley joined Apple in 2021 and published a blog post indicating that Delicious Library will not be further developed beyond keeping the software runnable on newer versions of macOS.

== Products ==
=== Delicious Library ===
In November 2004, Delicious Monster released Delicious Library as a Mac OS X-only media library catalog application and generated $250,000 worth of sales. The software went on to win several Apple Design Awards, including Best Mac OS X User Experience and runner-up Best Product New to Mac OS X in 2005 and Best Mac OS X Leopard Application in 2007. It is currently available as version 3.

Until November 2024, Delicious Library was available through the official website and in the Mac App Store. It was taken down because the APIs used by the app were retired.
