= Jason Snell =

Jason Snell may refer to:

- Jason Snell (footballer) (born 1977), Australian rules footballer
- Jason Snell (visual effects artist), American special effects supervisor
- Jason Snell (writer) (born 1970), American writer and podcaster
