= OmniOutliner =

- Developer(s): The Omni Group
- Stable release: macOS: 5.13.1 (July 30, 2024; 14 months ago) [±]; iOS: 3.11.1 (July 30, 2024; 14 months ago) [±]
- Operating system: macOS, iOS
- Type: Outliner
- License: Commercial
- Website: OmniOutliner website

OmniOutliner is commercial outlining software for macOS and iOS produced by The Omni Group. OmniOutliner has most of the features of a conventional outliner, allowing the user to create nested lists of topics for almost any purpose, but has additional features extending its functionality beyond simple outlining. Recent versions of the software are universal binaries. OmniOutliner received a special mention in the 2005 Apple Design Awards, and Macworld gave the "Professional" version its highest rating.

== History ==
OmniOutliner 4 for Mac was released on January 15, 2014, with a modern redesign with new sidebars and a dynamic inspector, text zooming, smart match, date pasting logic, and more.

OmniOutliner 2 for iOS was released alongside it.

OmniOutliner 4.5 for Mac was released on March 2, 2016, a major update with more control printing selected rows, filtering indentation, export with tab separated indentation, and more.

OmniOutliner 5 for Mac was released on April 5, 2017.

OmniOutliner 3 for iOS was released in 2018.

== Feature set ==
=== Outlining ===
OmniOutliner provides the basic functions of an outliner, structuring content in a hierarchy of rows indented under one another to show the relationships between different items. The user can expand or collapse outline levels for easy viewing, sort topics, promote or demote the level of a topic, or "hoist" one level so only that topic is shown. It supports considerable control over styles, allowing the user to make global changes to the appearance of the outline at particular level. It also permits the user to add notes to any row, which can be displayed in-line, (i.e. within the structure of the outline) or in a separate pane below the outline. OmniOutliner documents can incorporate multimedia elements, including images, audio, and video, as well as PDF documents and web links.

In addition, OmniOutliner allows the addition of columns to the outline, so that the user can create rudimentary spreadsheets. There is limited support for summarizing columns, such as totaling or averaging, albeit not with anything close to the variety of functions provided in conventional spreadsheet software such as Microsoft Excel.

OmniOutliner does not support cloning, a feature of some outliners that allows one topic to appear at more than one place in the outline. The Omni Group may, however, add this feature sometime in the future.

=== Extensibility ===
OmniOutliner supports scripting via AppleScript, and users have extended the software to export to iCal, Apple's calendaring software, and even the iPod.

=== Import and export ===
OmniOutliner's document format is proprietary, but it can export to OPML, HTML, DOCX, and several text and rich text formats. It can import from several other document formats (ACTA, MORE, Keynote, and Concurrence), as well as text and rich text formats.
