= Andy Ihnatko =

American journalist

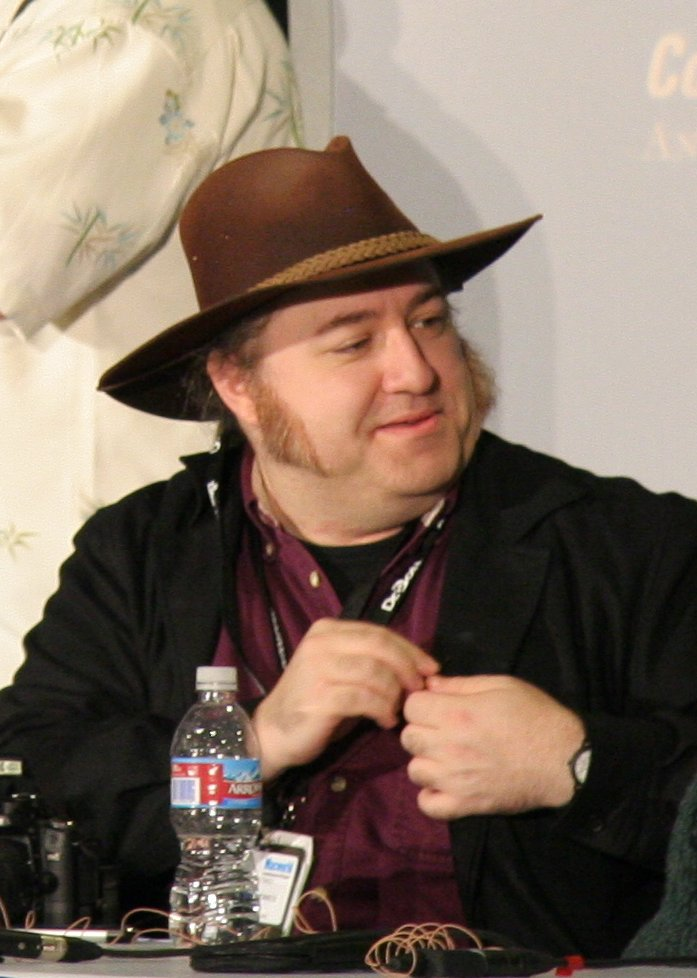
- Andy Ihnatko at Macworld 2008
- Born: November 18, 1967 (age 58)
- Presenting career
- Country: USA
- Website: Celestial Waste of Bandwidth blog

Andy Ihnatko /ɪˈnɑːtkoʊ/ (born November 18, 1967) is an American tech author and former technology journalist for the Chicago Sun-Times. He resides in Providence, Rhode Island. He is a co-host on the Material podcast, on Relay FM's network. He also appears on Leo Laporte's podcasts, specifically MacBreak Weekly and TWiT, and is a regular on the MacNotables podcast hosted by Chuck Joiner, where he is often paired with fellow technology journalist Adam Engst. In September 2011, he launched an ongoing podcast called The Ihnatko Almanac with Dan Benjamin on Benjamin's 5by5 Studios network.

== Career ==
Ihnatko appeared on the CBS Saturday Early Show on July 13, 2007, where he discussed applications for cell phones intended to imitate, if not exceed, the capabilities of the Apple iPhone. He appeared again on August 25, 2007, to report his conclusions after testing several urban legends about recovering mobile phones that had been submerged under water.

For a brief time in July 2007, Ihnatko was believed to be the author of the satirical "The Secret Diary of Steve Jobs" weblog, until his formal denial on July 24 in an article for Macworld. He has also formally neither confirmed nor denied involvement in the Steve Jobs autobiography, which was rumoured on Valleywag.

Ihnatko's writing style includes references to US popular culture, P. G. Wodehouse, comic books, cartoons, and science fiction.

Ihnatko is thought to have coined the term "Macquarium" to describe an aquarium made out of the empty shell of an early Macintosh computer. He wrote and posted online the first comprehensive set of instructions to construct one.

On September 26, 2011, Andy joined podcast network 5by5 as co-host of a weekly show, The Ihnatko Almanac, with Dan Benjamin. The show ended on October 19, 2016

In July 2015, Ihnatko, along with Russell Ivanovic and Yasmine Evjen, started the Material podcast on the Relay FM network. The podcast discusses technology company Google and related topics, and takes its name from the design language of the same name developed by Google.
