= John Gruber =

American technologist

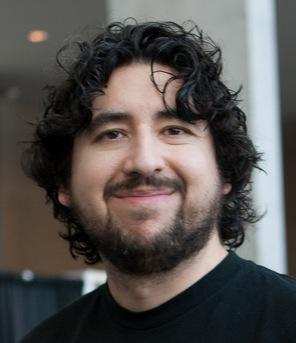
- John Gruber in 2009
- Born: 1973 (age 52–53); United States
- Education: Drexel University (BS)
- Occupations: Blogger, podcaster
- Spouse: Amy Jane Gruber
- Writing career
- Language: English
- Subjects: Design, technology, Apple Inc.
- Notable works: Markdown, Daring Fireball, The Talk Show, Vesper
- Website: daringfireball.net

John Gruber (born 1973) is an American technology blogger, UI designer, and co-creator of the Markdown markup language. Gruber writes the Apple enthusiast blog Daring Fireball and hosts its accompanying podcast, The Talk Show.

== History ==
Gruber is from Philadelphia, Pennsylvania. He received his Bachelor of Science in computer science from Drexel University, and worked for Bare Bones Software (2000–02) and Joyent (2005–06).

In 2004, Aaron Swartz and Gruber worked together to create the Markdown language, with the goal of enabling people "to write using an easy-to-read and easy-to-write plain text format, optionally convert it to structurally valid XHTML (or HTML)".

== Media ==
=== Daring Fireball ===
Since 2002, Gruber has written and produced Daring Fireball, a technology-focused weblog. He has described his Daring Fireball writing as a "Mac column in the form of a weblog". The site is written in the form of a tumblelog called The Linked List, a linklog with brief commentary, in between occasional longform articles that discuss Apple products and issues in related consumer technology. Gruber often writes about user interfaces, software development, Mac applications, and Apple's media coverage. On Daring Fireball, Gruber tends to cover Apple in a positive manner and defend Apple against criticism. Media outlets have described Gruber as an Apple "fanboy" in conjunction with his writing on the website; (Note: Sources describing Gruber as an Apple "fanboy":) Gruber responded in a 2011 interview that although he does not use the term fanboy, he supports Apple because he appreciates the company.

=== The Talk Show ===
The Talk Show is a technology podcast started by Gruber intended as a "director's commentary" to Daring Fireball. Guests are usually programmers, designers, analysts and journalists.

In June 2007, Gruber and Dan Benjamin began co-hosting an independent podcast featuring conversations and commentary on trends, mainly focusing on technology at thetalkshow.net. This format persisted but the show "started over" and helped establish Benjamin's 5by5 Studios network. The show ran from July 2010 until May 2012 for a total of 90 episodes. Gruber moved the show to the Mule Radio Syndicate network in May 2012. This time, Gruber changed the format and became the sole host of the show with alternating guests each episode. The show ran for 80 episodes and in May 2014, The Talk Show parted ways with Mule Radio and became part of Daring Fireball. The show continues to use the episode number scheme and logo started at Mule Radio.

Apple Inc. senior vice president (SVP) of worldwide marketing Phil Schiller appeared as a guest on the live episode of The Talk Show during WWDC 2015 in San Francisco. Apple SVPs Eddy Cue and Craig Federighi appeared as guests on a recorded episode published February 12, 2016. Phil Schiller and Craig Federighi also appeared on the live episodes of The Talk Show during WWDC 2016 and 2017.

=== Other works ===
In early 2013, Gruber, Brent Simmons, and Dave Wiskus founded software development firm Q Branch to develop the Vesper notes app for iOS. The venture was not successful, and Q Branch has since shut down. In March 2020, Gruber started a new podcast with friend and colleague Ben Thompson called Dithering. Each episode is exactly 15 minutes long and access to the show is granted via subscription.
