= Dan Benjamin =

American podcaster and software developer

- Born: October 26, 1972 (age 54); Rydal, Pennsylvania, USA
- Occupations: Broadcaster, writer, software developer, designer
- Known for: Founder of 5by5 and Fireside.fm
- Website: danbenjamin.com

Dan Paul Benjamin (born October 26, 1972) is an American software developer, user interface designer, writer, and podcaster. He founded the podcast network 5by5 and the podcast-hosting platform Fireside.fm, and later became chief technology officer of Spooler Media.

== Career ==
Benjamin graduated with a B.A. in technical writing with a computer science focus from the University of Central Florida in 1994.

Earlier in his career, Benjamin co-founded the websites Cork'd and Playgrounder, wrote the content management system behind A List Apart, and produced educational screencasts through PeepCode. He appeared several times on the Fox News program Strategy Room – Gadgets and Games.

In 2010, Benjamin founded 5by5, a podcast production network whose shows included several he co-hosted, such as Back to Work with Merlin Mann and The Ihnatko Almanac with Andy Ihnatko. On the strength of these podcasts, Philip Elmer-DeWitt of Fortune and CNN called him "the king of Apple talk radio". The final episode of Back to Work, its 644th, was published in April 2024, and in 2025 the company 5by5 Productions was listed as inactive in Texas business records.

In 2016, Benjamin released Fireside.fm, a platform for podcasters, which was acquired by Very Good Software in 2024. In February 2022, he became chief technology officer of Spooler Media, an audio publishing tools company. In October 2025, he launched a project called The Unusual Newsletter.
