= Peter Wayner =

American writer

Peter Wayner is an American writer known for his books on technology and his writing in mainstream publications including The New York Times, InfoWorld, and Wired magazine. His work on mimic functions, a camouflaging technique for encoding data so it takes on the statistical characteristics of other information, is an example of steganography, and was the basis of his 2009 book, Disappearing Cryptography.

In 2018, he received attention for writing an article about the New York City transit system, advocating for replacing large subway trains with competing fleets of smaller, thinner and more nimble autonomous cars, scooters, hoverboards and pods. The article received widespread criticism.

== Bibliography (selected) ==
- Wayner, Peter (2008). Disappearing Cryptography -- A book on steganography, information hiding, watermarking and other techniques for disguising information. Morgan Kaufmann. ISBN 978-0-12-374479-1.
- Wayner, Peter (2003). Policing Online Games -- How mathematics can make online games more honest and fair. Flyzone Press. ISBN 978-0-9675844-2-3.
- Wayner, Peter (2002). Translucent Databases -- How to create databases that answer questions without holding any information inside them. Most of the techniques involve applying a one-way function to personal data. Flyzone Sr Llc. ISBN 978-0-9675844-1-6.
- Wayner, Peter (2000). Free for All: How LINUX and the Free Software Movement Undercut the High-Tech Titans. HarperCollins. ISBN 0-06-662050-3.
- Wayner, Peter (1999). Compression Algorithms for Real Programmers (The For Real Programmers Series). Morgan Kaufmann. ISBN 978-0-12-788774-6.
- Wayner, Peter (1995). Agents Unleashed: A Public Domain Look at Agent Technology. Morgan Kaufmann. ISBN 978-0-12-738765-9.
- Wayner, Peter (2013). Future Ride: 80 Ways the Self-Driving, Autonomous Car Will Change Everything from Buying Groceries to Teen Romance to Surviving a Hurricane to Turning Ten to Having a Heart Attack to Building a Dream Home to Simple Getting from Here to There. CreateSpace Independent Publishing Platform. ISBN 978-1484123331.
