= Delicious Library =

Digital asset management app

- Screenshot of Delicious Library 3
- Developer: Delicious Monster
- Release: November 2004
- Stable release: 3.9.3
- Operating system: Mac OS X Mountain Lion and later
- Platform: Apple Macintosh
- Type: Digital asset management
- License: Shareware
- Website: delicious-monster.com

Delicious Library was a digital asset management app for Mac OS X, developed by Delicious Monster to allow the user to keep track and manage their physical collections of books, movies, CDs, and video games.

The software was initially released in November 2004, with $250,000 in sales in its first month. Delicious Library 2 was released officially on May 27, 2008, although the final version was available from March 25. Delicious Library 3 was available from the Mac App Store and the developer's website for Macintosh systems running OS 10.8 or higher, until November 2024.

The software is no longer supported by the authors. In November 2024, the APIs used by the app were retired and Shipley pulled the app and the website.

== Features ==
- Enter media items in the following ways:
  - Manually
  - Inputting the ISBN or UPC
  - Importing the library from another application (like Bookpedia)
  - Drag-and-dropping an Amazon.com URL
  - Scanning barcodes using a Bluetooth scanner, an iSight camera, or a USB-keyboard-type barcode scanner (such as a modified CueCat)
- Integration with Mac OS X's Address Book application to allow "lending management"
- Voice Search
- iPod syncing
- Spotlight compatibility
- Mini Bookshelf Dashboard widget
- Printouts of specific shelves or entire libraries
- Custom Collections allow the user to create their own "shelves" to organize their media.

== Easter eggs ==
- When a Star Wars item is added, Delicious Library says, "I am your father", in the whisper voice
- When a Harry Potter item is added, Delicious Library says "Voldemort", in the whisper voice
- When A Brief History of Time is added, the library talks about science concepts in a mock-synthesized voice
- When Rock Band is added, Delicious Library sings a portion of "Run to the Hills" by Iron Maiden in the whisper voice

== Mobile apps ==
The only Delicious Library app was withdrawn from the iOS App Store in July 2009. Amazon had asked for the app to be removed due to violation of the Amazon API terms and conditions section 4e "(e) You will not, without our express prior written approval requested via this link, use any Product Advertising Content on or in connection with any site or application designed or intended for use with a mobile phone or other handheld device."

=== Awards ===
- Apple Design Award Best Mac OS X Leopard Application 2007 Winner
- Apple Design Award Best Mac OS X user experience 2005 winner
- Apple Design Award Best product new to Mac OS X 2005 runner-up
- Macworld SF 2005 showtime award winner
- Macworld 2005 Eddy winner
- O'Reilly Innovators Award 2004 (First place winner)

== See also ==
- MediaMan, a similar application for Windows
- GCstar, an open-source cross-platform similar application available for Windows, Linux, and Mac OS X.
