= Task management =

Process of managing a task through its life cycle

Example of a kanban board used in software development

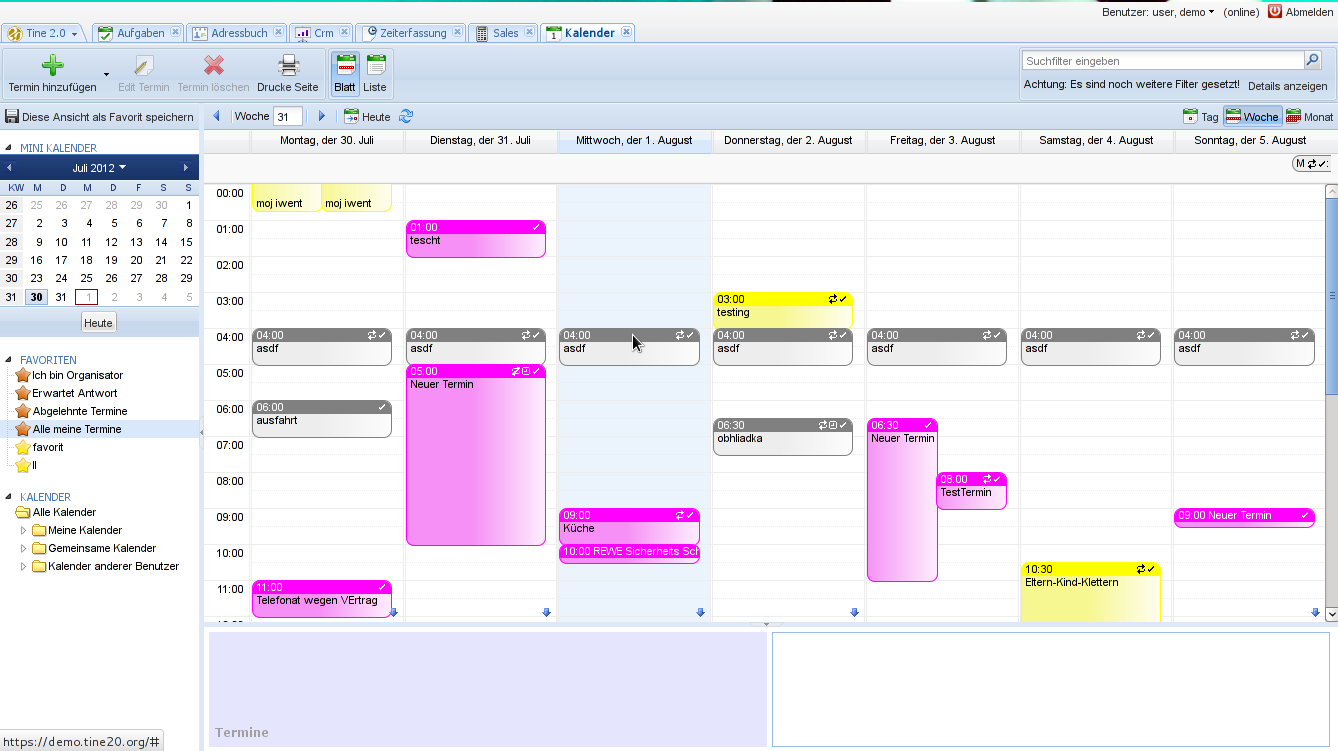
A digital calendar in week view with 24-hour time

Task management is the process of overseeing a task through its lifecycle. It involves planning, testing, tracking, and reporting. Task management can help individuals achieve goals or enable groups of individuals to collaborate and share knowledge for the accomplishment of collective goals. Tasks are also differentiated by complexity, from low to high.

Effective task management requires overseeing all aspects of a task, including its status, priority, time, human and financial resource assignments, recurrence, dependencies, notifications, etc. These can be lumped together broadly as the fundamental activities of task management.

Managing tasks for multiple individuals or teams can be facilitated by specialized software, such as workflow or project-management software.

Task management may be a component of project management and process management, serving as the foundation for efficient workflow within an organization. Project managers adhering to task-oriented management have a detailed and up-to-date project schedule and are usually good at directing team members and moving the project forward.

== Task lifecycle ==
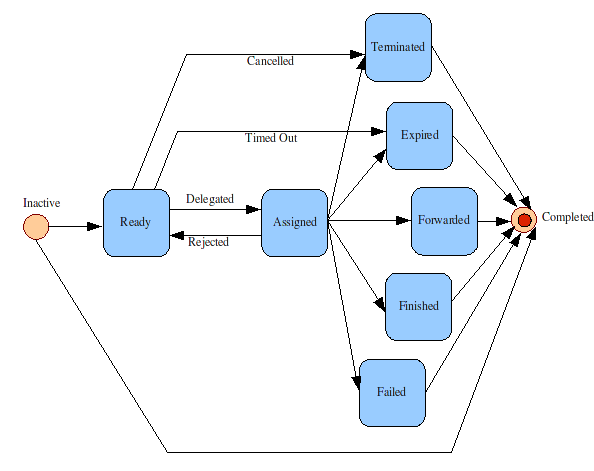
Example of a finite-state diagram of a task over its lifecycle published by IBM

The status of tasks can be described by these states:

- Ready
- Assigned
- Terminated
- Expired
- Forwarded
- Started
- Finished
- Verified
- Paused
- Failed

The state machine diagram to the right is referenced from IBM and describes different states of a task over its lifecycle. A more up-to-date task-state machine diagram, which is applicable to the modern continuous delivery method, has also been published.

== Activities supported by tasks ==
As a discipline, task management embraces several key activities. Various conceptual breakdowns exist, at a high level, these always include creative, functional, project, performance, and service activities.

- Creative activities pertain to task creation. In this context, they should facilitate task planning, brainstorming, creation, elaboration, clarification, organization, reduction, targeting, and preliminary prioritization.
- Functional activities pertain to personnel, sales, quality, or other management areas, ultimately ensuring the production of final goods and services for delivery to customers. Within this context, these activities should enable planning, reporting, tracking, prioritizing, configuring, delegating, and managing tasks.
- Project activities pertain to planning and time and cost reporting. While these activities may involve multiple functional aspects, they are always more significant and purposeful than the sum of their parts. In context, project activities should support project task breakdown (also known as work breakdown structure), task allocation, inventory across projects, and concurrent access to task databases.
- Service activities pertain to client and internal company-services provision, including customer relationship management and knowledge management. In context, they should support file attachments and links to tasks, document management, access rights management, inventory of client and employee records, orders and calls management, and annotating tasks.
- Performance activities pertain to tracking performance and fulfillment of assigned tasks. In context, these should allow for tracking by time, cost control, stakeholders, priority, charts, exportable reports, status updates, deadline adjustments, and activity logging.
- Report activities involve presenting information regarding the other five activities listed, including graphical displays.

== Software ==
Task management software tools abound in the marketplace. Some are free, while others are intended for enterprise-wide deployment purposes. Some are simple to-do lists, while others boast enterprise-wide task creation, visualization, and notification capabilities, among other features. Task management is used by small to Fortune 100-sized companies. It does support simple individual projects to corporate task management activities.

Project management software, calendaring software, and workflow software often include advanced task management features, supporting a variety of task-related activities within a comprehensive software environment. These functionalities complement the numerous project and performance tasks integrated into high-quality enterprise-level task management software products.

Key software dimensions that intersect across various lines of task management products include task creation, task visualization, notifications, resource assignment, compatibility, configurability, scalability, and reporting.

- Task creation encompasses collaborative capabilities for turning ideas into actions (tasks). This includes activities involved in defining the task and encompasses the collaboration needed in the planning process.
- Task visualization involves presenting tasks, most often in time and list forms. Priority visualization encompasses classification (e.g., budget, time, stakeholder) and mechanism (e.g., color code or text). Calendaring covers scheduling (e.g., availability, meetings, appointments, and other potential conflicts) and notifications.
- Notifications encompass configurable settings for informing past, present, and pending deadlines.
- Assigning resource encompasses the ability to delegate tasks and tools to single or multiple people.
- Compatibility encompasses the ability of a task management environment to connect to other systems, software, and environments. It includes setting a structure and restrictions on communication going from the task management environment to other software, systems, and environments.
- Configurability encompasses the ability to add, remove, and manage functionality and usability in task management environments.
- Scalability encompasses the ability to perform a task properly when there is a change in the quantity of users to meet the specific task requirements.
- Reporting encompasses presenting information by displaying it either in a tabular or graphical display.

== See also ==
- Gantt chart
- Digital calendar
- Time blocking
- Issue tracking system
- Milestone (project management)
- Outline of management
- Time management
- Time-tracking software
- Work breakdown structure
- Workers' self-management
