= Time management =

Planning time spent on specific activities

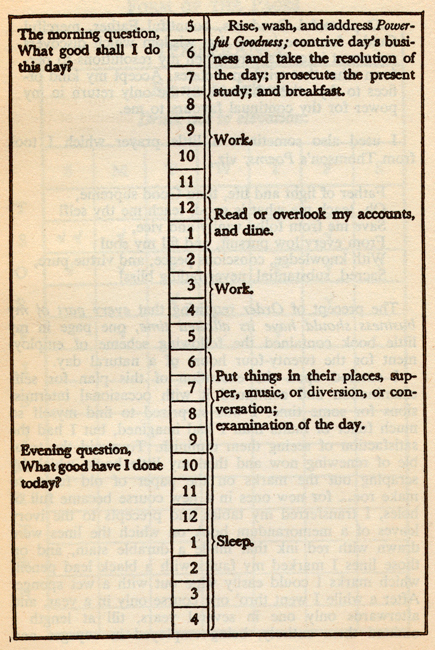
Benjamin Franklin's daily schedule

Time management is the process of planning and exercising conscious control of time spent on specific activities—especially to increase effectiveness, efficiency, and productivity.

Time management involves demands relating to work, social life, family, hobbies, personal interests and commitments. Using time effectively gives people more choices in managing activities. Time management may be aided by a range of skills, tools and techniques, especially when accomplishing specific tasks, projects and goals that have a due date.

== Cultural views ==
Differences in the way a culture views time can affect the way their time is managed. For example, a linear time view is a way of conceiving time as flowing from one moment to the next in a linear fashion. This linear perception of time is predominant in America and most Northern European countries, such as Germany, Switzerland and England. People in these cultures tend to place a large value on productive time management and tend to avoid decisions or actions that would result in wasted time. This linear view of time correlates to these cultures being more "monochronic", or preferring to do only one thing at a time. As a result, this focus on efficiency often leads to a culture of punctuality and a strong emphasis on meeting deadlines.

Another cultural time view is the multi-active time view. In multi-active cultures, most people feel that the more activities or tasks being done at once the better. This creates a sense of happiness. Multi-active cultures are "polychronic" or prefer to do multiple tasks at once. This multi-active time view is prominent in most Southern European countries such as Spain, Portugal and Italy. In these cultures, people often tend to spend time on things they deem to be more important such as placing a high importance on finishing social conversations. In business environments, they often pay little attention to how long meetings last and instead focus on having high-quality meetings. In general, the cultural focus tends to be on synergy and creativity over efficiency.

A final cultural time view is a cyclical time view. In cyclical cultures, time is considered neither linear nor event related. Because days, months, years, seasons, and events happen in regular repetitive occurrences, time is viewed as cyclical. In this view, time is not seen as wasted because it will always come back later, hence there is an unlimited amount of it. This cyclical time view is prevalent throughout most countries in Asia, including Japan and China. It is more important in cultures with cyclical concepts of time to focus on completing tasks correctly, thus most people will spend more time thinking about decisions and the impact they will have, before acting on their plans. Most people in cyclical cultures tend to understand that other cultures have different perspectives of time and are cognizant of this when acting on a global stage. Consequently, this awareness often leads to a greater emphasis on relationships and the quality of interactions over strict adherence to schedules.

== Neuropsychology ==
Excessive and chronic inability to manage time effectively may result from attention deficit hyperactivity disorder (ADHD). Diagnostic criteria include a sense of underachievement, difficulty getting organized, trouble getting started, trouble managing many simultaneous projects, and trouble with follow-through.

== Methods ==
=== Task list organization ===
Task lists are often prioritized in the following ways:

- A list of things to do, numbered in the order of their importance and done in that order one at a time as daily time allows, is attributed to consultant Ivy Lee as the most profitable advice received by Charles M. Schwab, president of the Bethlehem Steel Corporation.
- An early advocate of "ABC" prioritization was Alan Lakein, in 1973. In his system "A" items were the most important ("A-1" the most important within that group), "B" next most important, "C" least important.
- To prioritize a daily task list, one either records the tasks in the order of highest priority, or assigns them a number after they are listed ("1" for highest priority, "2" for second highest priority, etc.) which indicates in which order to execute the tasks. The latter method is generally faster, allowing the tasks to be recorded more quickly.

Various writers have stressed potential difficulties with to-do lists such as the following.

- To remain flexible, a task system must allow for unforeseen circumstances.
- To avoid getting stuck in a wasteful pattern, the task system should also include regular (monthly, semi-annual, and annual) planning and system-evaluation sessions, to weed out inefficiencies and ensure the user is headed in the desired direction.

=== GTD (Getting Things Done) ===
The Getting Things Done method, created by David Allen, is to finish small tasks immediately and for large tasks to be divided into smaller tasks to start completing now. The thrust of GTD is to encourage the user to get their tasks and ideas out and on paper and organized as quickly as possible so they are easy to see and manage. "The truth is, it takes more energy to keep something inside your head than outside," says Allen.

=== Pomodoro ===
Francesco Cirillo's "Pomodoro Technique" was originally conceived in the late 1980s and gradually refined until it was later defined in 1992. The technique is the namesake of a tomato-shaped kitchen timer initially used by Cirillo during his time at university. The "Pomodoro" is described as the fundamental metric of time within the technique and is traditionally defined as being 30 minutes long, consisting of 25 minutes of work and 5 minutes of break time. Cirillo also recommends a longer break of 15 to 30 minutes after every four Pomodoros.

=== Franklin Planner ===
The Franklin Planner is a paper-based time management system created by Hyrum W. Smith and named after Benjamin Franklin, which gained widespread popularity during the 1980s and 1990s. The methodology emphasizes connecting daily tasks to long-term goals and personal values, promoting the concept of "beginning with the end in mind" to ensure that daily activities align with larger life purposes. The system utilizes a ring-binder format planner containing specialized pages for daily planning, monthly and weekly calendars, goal-setting worksheets, and values clarification exercises. Its distinctive feature is the ABC priority system combined with numerical rankings (A1, A2, B1, etc.) for task prioritization, where A represents vital tasks, B important ones, and C nice-to-do items.

=== Eisenhower method ===
A basic Eisenhower matrix to help evaluate urgency and importance. Items may be placed at more precise points within each quadrant.

The Eisenhower method or Eisenhower principle is a method that utilizes the principles of importance and urgency to organize priorities and workload. This method stems from a quote attributed to Dwight D. Eisenhower: "I have two kinds of problems, the urgent and the important. The urgent are not important, and the important are never urgent." Eisenhower did not claim this insight for his own, but attributed it to an unnamed "former college president."

Using the Eisenhower decision principle, tasks are evaluated using the criteria important/unimportant and urgent/not urgent, and then placed in according quadrants in an Eisenhower matrix. Tasks in the quadrants are then handled as follows.

1. Important/Urgent quadrant tasks are done immediately and personally
2. Important/Not Urgent quadrant tasks get an end date and are done personally
3. Unimportant/Urgent quadrant tasks are delegated
4. Unimportant/Not Urgent quadrant tasks are dropped

== See also ==
- Attention management
- Chronemics
- Goal setting
- Interruption science
- Order
- Procrastination
- Professional organizing
- Project management
- Prospective memory
- Punctuality
- Scientific management
- Timeblocking
- Task management
- Time perception
- Time-tracking software
- Waiting period
- Workforce management
