= David Allen (author) =

American author and productivity consultant (born 1945)

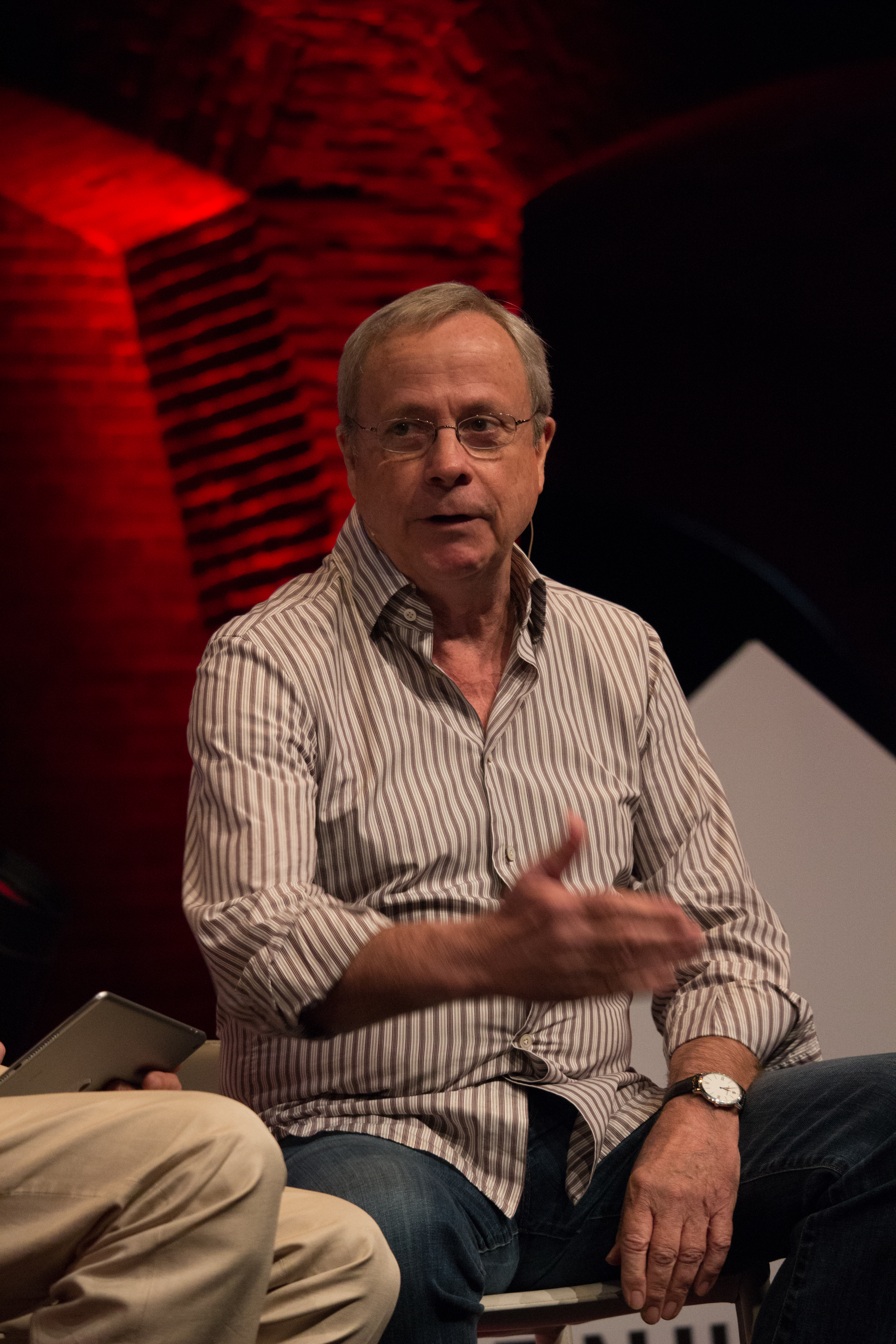
- David Allen in 2015.
- Born: December 28, 1945 (age 80)
- Education: New College; University of California, Berkeley
- Occupations: Management consultant and author
- Spouse: Kathryn
- David Allen's voice Recorded in May 2016
- Website: gettingthingsdone.com

David Allen (born December 28, 1945) is an American author and productivity consultant. He created the time management method Getting Things Done.

== Careers ==
Allen grew up in Shreveport, Louisiana where he acted and won a state championship in debate. He attended New College (now New College of Florida) in Sarasota, Florida, and completed graduate work in American history at the University of California, Berkeley.

After graduate school, Allen began using heroin and was briefly institutionalized. He is an ordained minister with the Movement of Spiritual Inner Awareness. He claims to have had 35 professions before age 35. He began applying his perspective on productivity with businesses in the 1980s when he began consulting at Lockheed's human resources department.

== Publications ==
Allen has written three books: Getting Things Done: The Art of Stress-Free Productivity, which describes his productivity program; Ready for Anything: 52 Productivity Principles for Work and Life, a collection of newsletter articles he has written; Making It All Work: Winning at the Game of Work and Business of Life, a follow-up to his first book. In 2015, he also wrote a new updated version of Getting Things Done: the Art of Stress-Free Productivity.

In 2024, David Allen has co-authored Team: Getting Things Done with Others on how to work effectively in groups using GTD Principles.

== Personal life ==
Allen lived in Ojai, California with his fourth wife, Kathryn. In 2014, they moved to Amsterdam in the Netherlands.

== Bibliography ==
- Allen, David (2001). Getting Things Done: The Art of Stress-Free Productivity. New York: Penguin Putnam. ISBN 978-0-14-200028-1.
- Allen, David (2003). Ready for Anything: 52 Productivity Principles for Work and Life. New York: Viking Books. ISBN 978-0-14-303454-4.
- Allen, David (2008). Making It All Work: Winning at the Game of Work and Business of Life. New York: Viking Adult. ISBN 978-0-67-001995-3.
- Allen, David (2015). Getting Things Done: The Art of Stress-Free Productivity (revised ed.). New York: Penguin Books. ISBN 978-0-14-312656-0.
