= Getting Things Done =

Personal productivity system and 2001 book

Getting Things Done: The Art of Stress-Free Productivity
- First edition cover
- Author: David Allen
- Subject: Business
- Publisher: Penguin Books
- Publication date: 2001
- English publication date: 2001
- Pages: 267
- ISBN: 978-0-14-312656-0 (2015 reprint edition)
- OCLC: 914220080

Getting Things Done (GTD) is a personal productivity system developed by David Allen and published in a book of the same name. GTD is described as a time management system. Allen states "there is an inverse relationship between things on your mind and those things getting done". (Note: Allen, in his 2001 book states that if a task is on one's mind, it will fill one's mind completely, which guarantees that one will be incapable of handling yet another task; therefore one will fail to complete any of them.)

The GTD method rests on the idea of moving all items of interest, relevant information, issues, tasks and projects out of one's mind by recording them externally and then breaking them into actionable work items with known time limits. (Note: "Will it take less than two minutes?" Yes -- then do it.) (Note: If you didn't get get it done within your expected timeline, then update your tools (meaning fix your project plan, or your lists, etc.)) This allows one's attention to focus on taking action on each task listed in an external record, instead of recalling them intuitively.

First published in 2001, a revised edition of the book was released in 2015 to reflect the changes in information technology during the preceding decade.

== Themes ==
Allen first demonstrates stress reduction from the method with the following exercise, centered on a task that has an unclear outcome or whose next action is not defined. Allen calls these sources of stress (Note: Allen claims stress can be reduced and productivity increased by identifying and tagging a stressor.) "open loops", "incompletes", or "stuff". (Note: When letting one's mind flow like water to the stressor, a corresponding feeling arises in one's body (say a finger, or elbow), or possibly an emotion such as anger; in a martial art, the practitioner does not betray that feeling; instead the practitioner remains vigilant, retains posture, and seeks to influence the possible outcome.)

1. The most annoying, distracting, or interesting task is chosen, and defined as an "incomplete".
2. A description of the successful outcome of the "incomplete" is written down in one sentence, along with the criteria by which the task will be considered completed. (Note: Once the source of the stressor is identified or tagged, one's mind can move beyond that specific problem, say to the cost, or to the benefit. The specific cost/benefit can then be formulated in words and written down, say using the tags or identifiers.)
3. The next step required to approach completion of the task is written down. (Note: Once the problem is identified with tags, one's mind can move beyond the stressor to the next stage, say to the effect of completing the prospective task.)
4. A self-assessment is made of the emotions experienced after completing the steps of this process. (Note: Once one's mind has moved beyond a problem, the mind is freed of it, and the practitioner can move on.)

He claims stress can be reduced and productivity increased by putting reminders about everything one is not working on into a trusted system external to one's mind. In this way, one can work on the task at hand without distraction from the "incompletes".

The system in GTD requires one to have the following tools within easy reach:

- An inbox
- A trash can
- A filing system for reference material
- Several lists (detailed below)
- A calendar (either a paper-based or digital calendar)

These tools can be physical or electronic as appropriate (e.g., a physical "in" tray or an email inbox). Then, as "stuff" enters one's life, it is captured in these tools and processed with the following workflow.

=== Workflow ===
Diagram illustrating the steps of inbox processing in Getting Things Done

The GTD workflow consists of five stages. The workflow is driven by five steps: capture, clarify, organize, reflect, and engage. (The first edition used the names collect, process, organize, plan, and do; the descriptions of the stages are similar in both editions). Once all the material ("stuff") is captured (or collected) in the inbox, each item is clarified and organized by asking and answering questions about each item in turn as shown in the gray boxes in the logic tree diagram. As a result, items end up in one of the eight end points in the diagram:

- in the trash
- on the someday/maybe list
- in a neat reference filing system
- on a list of tasks, with the outcome and next action defined if the "incomplete" is a "project" (i.e., if it will require two or more steps to complete it)
- immediately completed and checked off if it can be completed in under two minutes
- delegated to someone else and, if one wants a reminder to follow up, added to a "waiting for" list
- on a context-based "next action" list if there is only one step to complete it
- on one's calendar

Empty one's inbox or inboxes daily or at least weekly ("in" to empty). Do not use one's inbox as a "to do" list. Do not put clarified items back into the inbox. Emptying one's inbox does not mean finishing everything. It just means applying the "capture, clarify, organize" steps to all one's "stuff".

Next, reflection (termed planning in the first edition) occurs. Multi-step projects identified above are assigned a desired outcome and a single "next action". Finally, a task from one's task list is worked on ("engage" in the 2nd edition, "do" in the 1st edition) unless the calendar dictates otherwise. One selects which task to work on next by considering where one is (i.e., the "context", such as at home, at work, out shopping, by the phone, at one's computer, with a particular person), time available, energy available, and priority.

=== Implementation ===
Because hardware and software is changing so rapidly, GTD is deliberately technologically neutral. (In fact, Allen advises people to start with a paper-based system.) Many task management tools claim to implement GTD methodology and Allen maintains a list of some technology that has been adopted in or designed for GTD. Some are designated "GTD Enabled", meaning Allen was involved in the design.

=== Perspective ===
Allen emphasizes two key elements of GTD—control and perspective. The workflow is the center of the control aspect. The goal of the control processes in GTD is to get everything except the current task out of one's head and into this trusted system external to one's mind. He borrows a simile used in martial arts termed "mind like water". When a small object is thrown into a pool of water, the water responds appropriately with a small splash followed by quiescence. When a large object is thrown in the water again responds appropriately with a large splash followed by quiescence. The opposite of "mind like water" is a mind that never returns to quiescence but remains continually stressed by every input. With a trusted system and "mind like water" one can have a better perspective on one's life. Allen recommends reflection from six levels, called "Horizons of Focus":

- Horizon 5: Life
- Horizon 4: Long-term visions
- Horizon 3: 1–2 year goals
- Horizon 2: Areas of focus and accountability
- Horizon 1: Current projects
- Ground: Current actions

Unlike some theories, which focus on top-down goal-setting, GTD works in the opposite direction. Allen argues that it is often difficult for individuals to focus on big picture goals if they cannot sufficiently control the day-to-day tasks that they frequently must face. By developing and using the trusted system that deals with day-to-day inputs, an individual can free up mental space to begin moving up to the next level.

Allen recommends scheduling a weekly review, reflecting on the six different levels. The perspective gained from these reviews should drive one's priorities at the project level. Priorities at the project level in turn determine the priority of the individual tasks and commitments gathered during the workflow process. During a weekly review, determine the context for the tasks and put each task on its appropriate list. An example of grouping together similar tasks would be making a list of outstanding telephone calls, or the tasks/errands to perform while out shopping. Context lists can be defined by the set of tools available or by the presence of individuals or groups for whom one has items to discuss or present.

=== Summary ===
GTD is based on storing, tracking, and retrieving the information related to each thing that needs to get done. Mental blocks we encounter are caused by insufficient 'front-end' planning. This involves thinking in advance, and generating a series of actions which can later be undertaken without further planning. The mind's "reminder system" is inefficient and seldom (or too often) reminds us of what we need to do at the time and place when we can do it. Consequently, the "next actions" stored by context in the "trusted system" act as an external support which ensures that we are presented with the right reminders at the right time. As GTD relies on external reminders, it can be seen as an application of the theories of distributed cognition or the extended mind.

== Reception ==
In 2004, James Fallows in The Atlantic described GTD's main promise as not only allowing the practitioner to do more work but to feel less anxious about what they can and cannot do.

In 2005, Wired called GTD a "new cult for the info age", describing the enthusiasm for this method among information technology and knowledge workers as a kind of cult following. Allen's ideas have also been popularized through The Howard Stern Show (Stern referenced it daily throughout 2012's summer) and the Internet, especially via blogs such as 43 Folders, Lifehacker, and The Simple Dollar.

In 2005, Ben Hammersley interviewed David Allen for The Guardian article titled "Meet the man who can bring order to your universe", saying: "For me, as with the hundreds of thousands around the world who press the book into their friends' hands with fire in their eyes, Allen's ideas are nothing short of life-changing".

In 2007, Time magazine called Getting Things Done the self-help business book of its time.

In 2007, Wired ran another article about GTD and Allen, quoting him as saying "the workings of an automatic transmission are more complicated than a manual transmission ... to simplify a complex event, you need a complex system".

A 2008 paper in the journal Long Range Planning by Francis Heylighen and Clément Vidal of the Free University of Brussels (VUB) showed "recent insights in psychology and cognitive science support and extend GTD's recommendations".

== See also ==
- Human multitasking
- Life hack
- Pomodoro Technique
