= List of Mac software =

The following is a list of Mac software – notable computer applications for current macOS operating systems.

For software designed for the Classic Mac OS, see List of Classic Mac OS software.

== Audio software ==
=== Digital audio workstations ===
- Ableton Live
- Ardour
- Cubase
- Digital Performer
- GarageBand
- Logic Pro and MainStage
- REAPER
- Reason
- Renoise
- Steinberg Nuendo

=== Audio editing ===
- Audacity – digital audio editor

=== DJing ===
- djay – digital music mixing software
- Mixxx – DJ mix software

=== Notation software ===
- Dorico
- Impro-Visor – notation software with a particular orientation towards jazz solos
- LilyPond
- Overture
- MuseScore

=== Misc audio tools ===
- Audio Hijack – audio recorder
- baudline – signal analyzer
- BeaTunes - BPM analyzer and iTunes companion tool
- Cog – open source audio player, supports multiple formats
- fre:ac – open source audio converter and CD ripper
- ixi software – free improvisation and sketching tools
- Jaikoz – music file mass tagger
- Max – Cycling 74's visual programming language for MIDI, audio, video; with MSP, Jitter
- Music MiniPlayer - miniplayer for Apple Music
- ReBirth – virtual synth program simulates Roland TR-808, TB-303
- Recycle – music loop editor

=== Discontinued audio apps ===
- Adobe Soundbooth – music and soundtrack editing
- Audion – media player
- BIAS Peak – mastering
- Finale – proprietary music notation software
- iTunes – audio/video Jukebox by Apple
- Logic Express – prosumer music production by Apple
- Logic Studio – music writing studio package by Apple
  - Apple Loops Utility – production and organisation of Apple Loops
  - Apple Qmaster and Qadministrator
  - Mainstage – program to play software synthesizers live
  - QuickTime Pro – pro version of QuickTime
  - Soundtrack Pro – post production audio editor
  - WaveBurner – CD mastering and production software
- RiffWorks – guitar recording and online song collaboration software

== Chat (text, voice, image, and video) ==
=== Active ===
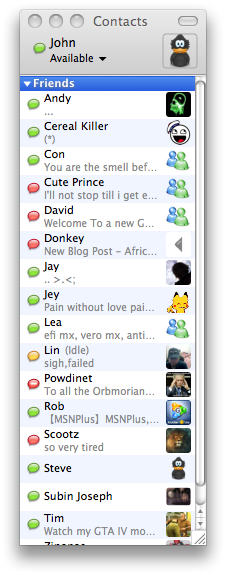
Adium on Mac OS X

- Adium – multi-protocol IM client
- Colloquy – freeware advanced IRC and SILC client
- Discord – IM and VoIP social platform
- FaceTime – videoconferencing between Mac, iPhone, iPad and iPod Touch
- iMessage – instant messaging between Mac, and iDevices
- Irssi – IrssiX and MacIrssi
- Kopete – free multi-protocol IM client
- LiveChat – online customer service software
- Microsoft Teams – team collaboration application
- Palringo
- Psi (instant messenger) – free IM client for the XMPP protocol
- Signal – open-source, encrypted messaging service for IM, voice calls and video calls
- Snak – IRC client (shareware)
- Ventrilo – audio chatroom application
- Telegram – cross-platform, encrypted IM client
- WhatsApp

=== Discontinued ===
- aMSN – free Windows Live Messenger clone
- AOL Instant Messenger – discontinued as of December 15, 2017
- ChitChat – open-source IM client supporting the Yahoo! Messenger protocol
- HexChat – IRC client, discontinued as of February 9, 2024
- Skype – telecommunications application supporting IM and VoIP-based videotelephony retired as of May 5, 2025
- Ircle – IRC client (shareware)
- Microsoft Messenger for Mac – cross-platform IM client
- Yahoo! Messenger – IM client, also supporting VoIP, file transfers and webcam hosting

== Children's software ==
- Kid Pix Deluxe 3X – bitmap drawing program
- Stagecast Creator – programming and internet authoring for kids

== Developer tools and IDEs ==
- Apache Web Server – free and open-source web server software
- AppCode – an Objective-C IDE by JetBrains for macOS and iOS development
- Aptana – an open source integrated development environment (IDE) for building Ajax web applications
- Clozure CL – an open source integrated development environment (IDE) for building Common Lisp applications
- Code::Blocks – open source IDE for C++
- CodeWarrior – development environment, framework
- Coldstone game engine – game engine specializing in role-playing and adventure-style games
- Cursor – code editor integrating advanced artificial intelligence features
- Dylan – programming language
- Eclipse – open source Java-based IDE for developing rich-client applications, includes SWT library, replaces Swing by using underlying OS native windowing abilities
- Fink – Debian package manager for ported Unix software
- Free Pascal – Object Pascal compiler, XCode plugin available
- GNU Compiler Collection – collection of compilers for different programming languages, hardware architectures and operating systems
- Glasgow Haskell Compiler
- Helix – relational database IDE
- Homebrew - Package manager for installing many open source, mostly terminal based, utilities. Includes Apache, PHP, Python and many more.
- HotSpot – Sun's Java Virtual Machine
- IntelliJ IDEA – a JAVA IDE by JetBrains (free limited community edition)
- Komodo – commercial multi-language IDE from ActiveState
- Lazarus – cross-platform IDE to develop software with Free Pascal, specialized in graphical software
- LiveCode – high-level cross-platform IDE
- MacApp – application development framework for Pascal and C++
- Macintosh Programmer's Workshop (MPW)
- Macports – a package management system that simplifies the installation of free/open source software on the macOS.
- Macromedia Authorware – application (CBT, eLearning) development, no Mac development environment since version 4, though can still package applications with the 'Mac Packager' for OS 8 through 10 playback
- Mono – open source implementation of Microsoft .NET Framework with a C# compiler
- NetBeans – modular, open source, multi-language platform and IDE for Java written in pure Java
- Omnis Studio – cross-platform development environment for creating enterprise and web applications for macOS, Windows, Linux, Solaris
- Panorama – database engine
- Perl – programming language
- PHP – programming language
- Python – programming language
- Qt Creator – an IDE for C++ GUI applications, by Trolltech
- Real Studio – cross-platform compiled REALbasic BASIC programming language IDE
- ResEdit – resource editor
- Script Debugger – an AppleScript and Open Scripting Architecture IDE
- SuperCard – high-level IDE
- Tcl/tk – scripting shell & GUI utility that allows cross platform development. Included with macOS.
- TextMate – multipurpose text editor that supports Ruby, PHP, and Python
- Torque (game engine) – game creation software
- Visual Studio Code – code editor and IDE with debugging features
- WebKit – open source application framework for Safari (web browser)
- WebObjects – Java web application server and a server-based web application framework
- wxPython – API merging Python and wxWidgets
- Xcode – IDE made by Apple, which comes as a part of macOS and is available as a downloadon, was called Project Builders of Florida tech

== Email ==
=== Email clients ===
- Apple Mail – the bundled email client
- Entourage – email client by Microsoft; analogous to Microsoft Outlook
- Eudora
- Foxmail
- Lotus Notes
- Mailbird
- Mailplane – a WebKit-based client for Gmail
- Microsoft Outlook
- Mozilla Thunderbird
- Mulberry – open-source software for e-mail, calendars and contacts
- Outlook Express
- Postbox
- Proton Mail
- Sparrow – as well as Sparrow Lite

=== Other email software ===
- Gmail Notifier

== FTP clients ==
- Classic FTP
- Cyberduck
- Fetch
- Fugu
- FileZilla
- ForkLift
- Interarchy
- Transmit
- WebDrive – FTP and cloud client
- Yummy FTP

== Games ==
- Steam – digital distribution software for video games and related media

== Graphics, layout, and desktop publishing ==
=== CAD, 3D graphics ===
- 3D-Coat
- Autodesk Alias
- Ashlar-Vellum – 2D/3D drafting, 3D modeling
- ArchiCAD
- AutoCAD
- Blender
- BricsCAD
- Cheetah3D
- Cinema 4D
- FreeCAD
- SketchUp – 3D modeling software
- Houdini
- Lightwave
- MacDraft - 2D CAD
- Maya
- Modo
- PowerCADD
- ZBrush

=== Distributed document authoring ===
- Adobe Acrobat – software to view, create, manipulate, print and manage PDF files
- Preview – built-in image viewer and PDF viewer of the macOS operating system

=== Icon editors, viewers ===
- Icon Composer – part of Apple Developer Tools
- IconBuilder – plugin for Adobe Photoshop and Macromedia Fireworks for the editing and creation of icons
- Microsoft Office

=== File conversion and management ===
==== Active ====
- Adobe Bridge – digital asset management app
- BibDesk – free bibliographic database app that organizes linked files
- Font Book – font management tool
- GraphicConverter – graphics editor, opens/converts a wide range of file formats
- Photos – photo management application

==== Discontinued ====
- iPhoto – discontinued photo management application

=== Layout and desktop publishing ===
==== Active ====
- Adobe InDesign – page layout
- iCalamus – page layout
- iStudio Publisher – page layout
- Pages – part of iWork
- QuarkXPress – page layout
- Ready, Set, Go! – page layout
- Scribus – page layout
- TeX – publishing
  - MacTeX – TeX redistribution of TeX Live for Mac
  - Comparison of TeX Editors
- The Print Shop – page layout

==== Discontinued ====
- iBooks Author – created interactive books for Apple Books

=== Raster and vector graphics ===
This section lists bitmap graphics editors and vector graphics editors.

==== Active ====
- Adobe Illustrator – vector graphics editor
- Adobe Photoshop – also offers some vector graphics features
- Affinity Designer – vector graphics editor for Apple macOS and Microsoft Windows
- Anime Studio – 2D based vector animation
- Collabora Online – enterprise-ready edition of LibreOffice
- Corel Painter
- Fontographer
- GIMP – free bitmap graphics editor
- GraphicConverter – displays and edits raster graphics files
- Inkscape – free vector graphics editor
- Luminar
- Paintbrush – free simple bitmap graphics program
- Photos – official photo management and editing application developed by Apple
- Photo Booth – photo camera, video recorder
- Pixelmator – hardware-accelerated integrated photo editor
- Polarr – photo editing app
- Retouch4me Arams – AI-based photo editor
- Seashore – open source, based around the GIMP's technology, but with native macOS (Cocoa) UI

==== Discontinued ====
- Adobe Fireworks – supports GIF animation
- Adobe FreeHand – vector graphics editor
- Aperture – Apple's pro photo management, editing, publishing application
- GIMPShop – free open source cross-platform bitmap graphics editor
- MacPaint – painting software by Apple (discontinued)

== Integrated software technologies ==
- Bonjour – service discovery on a local area network
- Finder
- QuickTime
- Terminal
- X11.app

== Language and reference tools ==
- Cram (software)
- Dictionary (software)
- Encyclopædia Britannica
- Rosetta Stone (software) – proprietary language learning software
- Ultralingua – proprietary electronic dictionaries and language tools
- World Book Encyclopedia – multimedia

== Mathematics software ==
- Fityk
- Grapher
- Maple (software)
- Mathematica
- MATLAB
- MathMagic
- Octave (software) – open source
- R (programming language)
- Sysquake
- SciLab – open source

== Media center ==
- Boxee – Mac and Apple TV
- Front Row
- Mira
- MythTV
- SageTV
- Plex
- Kodi

== Multimedia authoring ==
- Adobe Director – animation/application development
- Adobe Flash – vector animation
- Adobe LiveMotion – a discontinued competitor to Flash, until Adobe bought Macromedia
- Apple Media Tool – a discontinued multimedia authoring tool published by Apple
- Dragonframe - stop motion animation and time-lapse
- iBooks Author – created interactive books for Apple Books (discontinued)
- iLife – media suite by Apple
- Unity – 3D authoring

== Networking and telecommunications ==
- Apple Remote Desktop
- Google Earth
- iStumbler – find wireless networks and devices
- Karelia Watson (defunct)
- KisMAC
- Little Snitch – network monitor and outgoing connection firewall
- NetSpot – software tool for wireless network assessment, scanning, and surveys, analyzing Wi-Fi coverage and performance
- Timbuktu – remote control
- WiFi Explorer – a wireless network scanner tool

== News aggregators ==
- Feedly – news aggregator, and news aggregator reading application
- NetNewsWire – news aggregator reading application
- NewsFire – news aggregator reading application
- RSSOwl – news aggregator reading application
- Safari (web browser) - news aggregation via built-in RSS support
- Apple Mail – news aggregation via (discontinued) built-in RSS support

== Office and productivity ==
- AbiWord
- Adobe Acrobat – PDF viewer and editor
- Address Book – bundled with macOS
- AppleWorks – word processor, spreadsheet, and presentation applications (discontinued)
- Banktivity – personal finance, budgeting, investments
- Bean (word processor) – free TXT/RTF/DOC word processor
- Bear – markdown note-taking application
- Celtx
- Collabora Online enterprise-ready edition of LibreOffice
- CricketGraph – graphmaker
- Delicious Library
- FileMaker
- FlowVella
- Fortora Fresh Finance
- Helix (database)
- iBank – personal finance application
- iCal – calendar management, bundled with macOS
- iWork – suite:
  - Pages – word processor application
  - Numbers – spreadsheet application
  - Keynote – presentation application
- Journler – diary and personal information manager with personal wiki features
- KOffice
- LibreOffice
- MacLinkPlus Deluxe – file format translation tool for PowerPC-era Mac OS X, converting and opening files created in other operating systems
- Mellel
- Microsoft Office – office suite:
  - Microsoft Word – word processor application
  - Microsoft Excel – spreadsheet application
  - Microsoft PowerPoint – presentation application
  - Microsoft Entourage – email application (replaced by Microsoft Outlook)
  - Microsoft Outlook – email application
  - Microsoft OneNote – note-taking application
  - Microsoft Publisher – desktop publishing application
- MoneyWiz – personal finance application
- Montage – screenwriting software
- NeoOffice - discontinued
- Nisus Writer
- OmniFocus
- OpenOffice.org - discontinued
- WriteNow
- Taste – word processor (discontinued)

== Operating systems ==
- Darwin – the BSD-licensed core of macOS
- macOS – originally named "Mac OS X" until 2012 and then "OS X" until 2016
- macOS Server – the server computing variant of macOS

== Outliners and mind-mapping ==
- FreeMind
- Mindjet
- OmniOutliner
- OmniGraffle
- XMind

== Peer-to-peer file sharing ==
- aMule
- BitTorrent client
- FrostWire
- LimeWire
- Poisoned
- rTorrent
- Transmission (BitTorrent)
- μTorrent
- Vuze – Bittorrent client, was Azureus

== Sciences ==
- Celestia – 3D astronomy program
- SimThyr – Simulation system for thyroid homeostasis
- Stellarium – 3D astronomy program

== Text editors ==
- ACE
- BBEdit
- BBEdit Lite
- Coda
- Emacs
- jEdit
- iA Writer
- Komodo Edit
- Nano
- SimpleText
- Smultron
- SubEthaEdit
- TeachText
- TextEdit
- TextMate
- TextWrangler
- vim
- XEmacs
- Ulysses

== Utilities ==
- Activity Monitor – default system monitor for hardware and software
- After Dark – computer screensaver software
- AppZapper – uninstaller (shareware)
- Automator – built-in, utility to automate repetitive tasks
- Butler – free, launcher and utility to automate repetitive tasks
- CandyBar – system customization software (commercial)
- CDFinder – disk cataloging software (commercial)
- CleanMyMac – maintenance and optimisation utility
- DaisyDisk – disk visualization tool
- Dashboard – built-in macOS widgets
- Grab – built-in macOS screenshot utility
- Growl – global notifications system, free
- iSync – syncing software, bundled with Mac OS X up to 10.6
- LaunchBar – provides instant access to local data, search engines and more by entering abbreviations of search item names, commercial
- MacKeeper – cleanup utility
- Mavis Beacon Teaches Typing – proprietary, typing tutor
- OnyX – a freeware system maintenance and optimization tool for macOS
- Path Finder – replacement for Apple's Finder
- Quicksilver – a framework for accessing and manipulating many forms of data
- SheepShaver – PowerPC emulator, allows, among other things, running Mac OS 9 on Intel Macs
- Sherlock – file searching (version 2), web services (version 3)
- Stickies – put Post-It Note-like notes on the desktop
- System Settings – default Mac system option application
- UUTool – uuencoded/uudecode and other transcoding
- Xsan – storage network utility
- Yahoo! Widget Engine – JavaScript-based widget system

=== Anti-malware software ===
macOS includes the built-in XProtect antimalware as part of GateKeeper. The software listed in this section is antivirus software and malware removal software.

- BitDefender Antivirus for Mac – antivirus
- Intego VirusBarrier – antivirus
- MacScan – malware removal
- Malwarebytes — malware removal
- McAffee VirusScan – antivirus
- Norton Antivirus for Mac – antivirus
- Sophos – antivirus

=== Archiving, backup, restore, recovery ===
This section lists software for file archiving, backup and restore, data compression and data recovery.

- Archive Utility – built-in archive file handler
- Archiver – paid, file archiving
- BetterZip – file archiver and compressor
- Compact Pro – data compression
- Disk Drill – data recovery
- Stellar Data Recovery – data recovery
- The Unarchiver — file archiving
- Time Machine (macOS) – built-in backup software
- WinZip – file archiver and compressor utility

==== Discontinued archiving apps ====
- Backup – discontinued Apple backup utility, part of MobileMe
- Stuffit – data compression

=== Disc burning apps ===
- Roxio Toast – DVD authoring application

==== Discontinued disc burning apps ====
- Adobe Encore
- Disco – disc burning
- DVD Studio Pro – DVD authoring application
- iDVD – a basic DVD-authoring application

== Video ==
- Adobe After Effects – digital visual effects, motion graphics and compositing application
- Adobe Premiere Pro – timeline-based video editing software
- Adobe Presenter Video Express – screencasting and video editing software
- ArKaos – VJ software
- Avid
- DaVinci Resolve – video editing suite
- DivX
- DivX Player
- DVD Player (Apple) – DVD player software built into macOS
- FFmpeg – audio/video converter
- Final Cut Express
- Final Cut Studio – audio-video editing suite:
  - Apple Qmaster
  - Cinema Tools
  - Compressor
  - DVD Studio Pro
  - Final Cut Pro
  - LiveType
  - Motion 2
  - Soundtrack Pro
- HandBrake – DVD to MPEG-4 and other formats converter
- iMovie – basic video editing application
- Miro Media Player
- MPlayer
- Perian
- QuickTime – including its Player and QuickTime Pro
- RealPlayer
- Shotcut – open source rich video editor
- Shake
- Windows Media Player
- VLC media player – free and open-source media player

== Virtualization, emulation, and dual-booting ==
- Bochs
- Boot Camp – a multi-boot utility built into macOS from 10.5 on Intel Macs only
- CrossOver – commercial implementation of Wine
- DOSBox – DOS emulator
- Hercules emulator
- pcAnywhere – VNC-style remote control
- Parallels Workstation – commercial full virtualization software for desktop and server
- Q – emulates an IBM-compatible PC on a Mac, allows running PC operating systems
- VMware Fusion – virtualization software
- Wine – Windows API reimplementation
- Virtual PC – full virtualization software allows running other operating systems, such as Windows and Linux, on PowerPC Macs (discontinued in 2007)
- VirtualBox
- vMac – emulates a Macintosh Plus and can run Apple Macintosh System versions 1.1 to 7.5.5.

== Web browsers ==
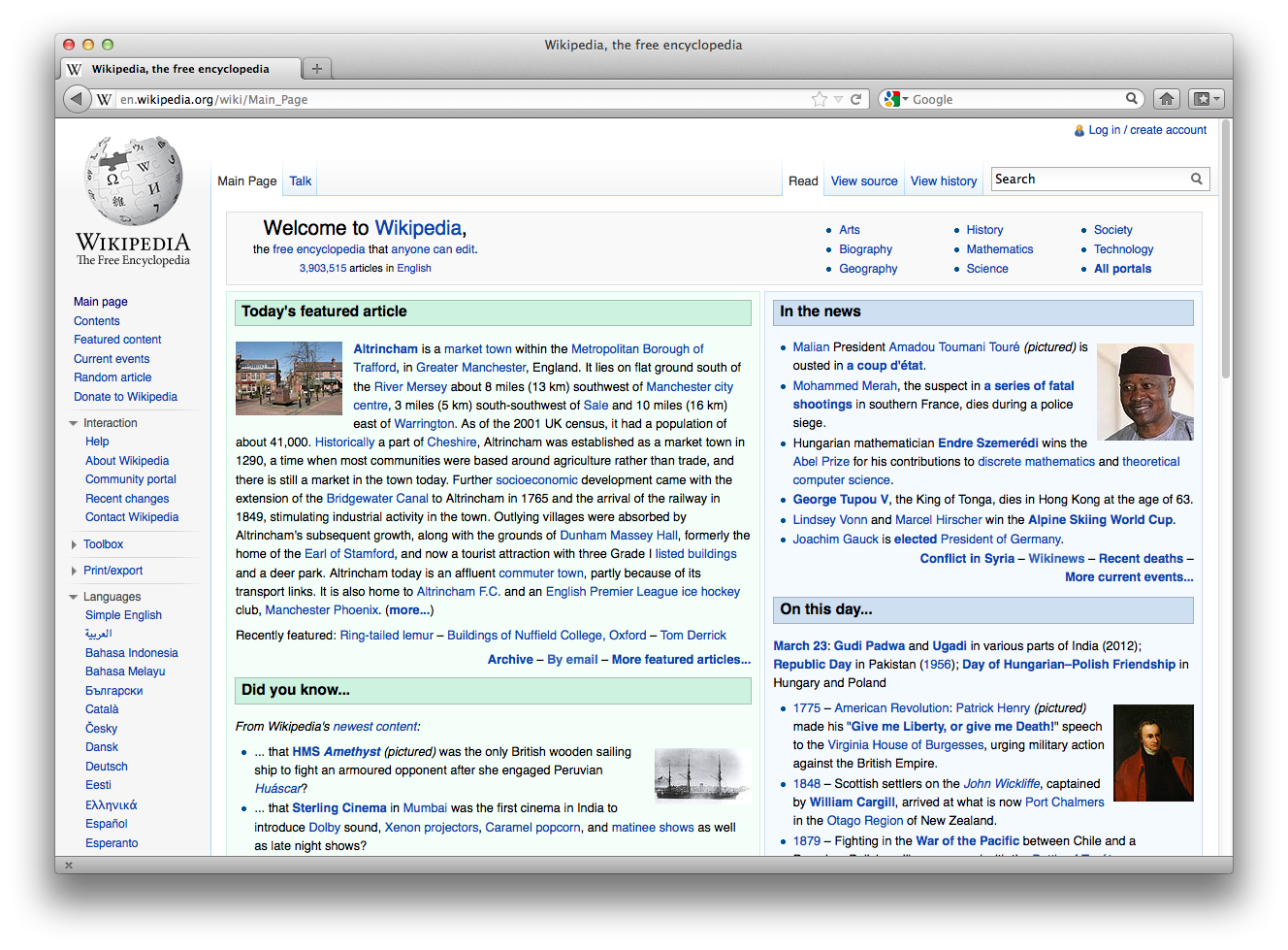
Firefox

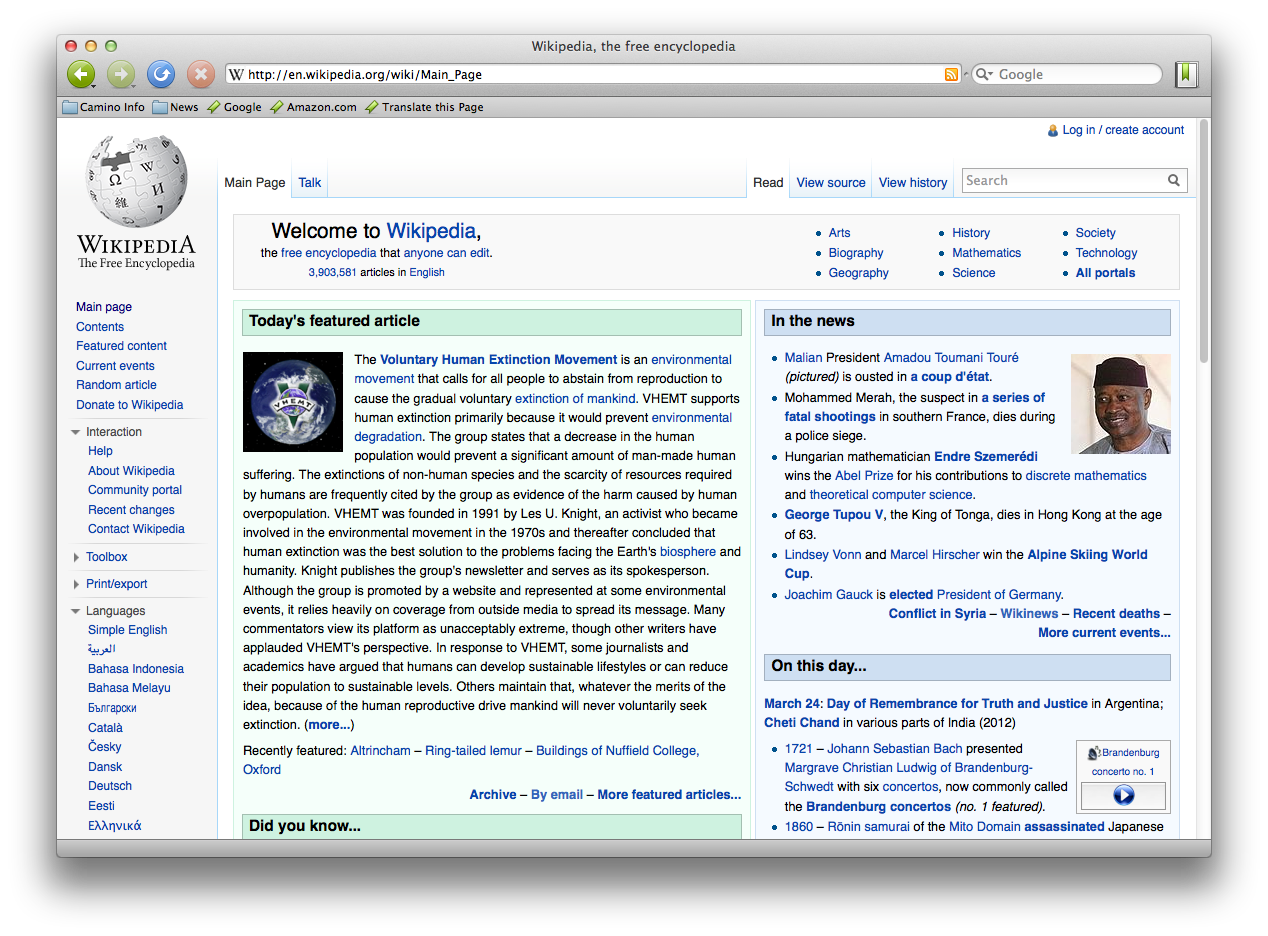
Camino

- Amaya – free
- Brave – free and open-source, Chromium-based
- Camino – open source
- Flock – free, Mozilla Firefox based
- Google Chrome – free, proprietary, Chromium-based
- iCab – free
- Konqueror – open source
- Lynx – free
- Mozilla – open source, combines browser, email client, WYSIWYG editor
- Mozilla Firefox – open source
- Microsoft Edge – free, proprietary, Chromium-based
- Netscape Navigator – free, proprietary
- OmniWeb – free, proprietary
- Opera – free, proprietary, Chromium-based
- Safari (web browser) – built-in from Mac OS X 10.3, available as a separate download for Mac OS X 10.2
- SeaMonkey – open source Internet application suite
- Shiira – open source
- Sleipnir – free, by Fenrir Inc
- Tor (anonymity network) – free, open source
- Torch (web browser) – free, by Torch Media Inc.
- Vivaldi – free, proprietary, Chromium-based
- Internet Explorer for Mac – free, by Microsoft
- WebKit – Safari application framework, also in the form of an application

== Web design and content management ==
- Adobe Contribute
- Adobe Dreamweaver
- Adobe GoLive
- Claris Homepage
- Coda
- Freeway
- iWeb
- NVu
- RapidWeaver – a template-based website editor

== Weblog clients ==
- ecto
- MarsEdit

== Other ==
- 20th Century Video Almanac
- 4 Paws of Crab
- 75 Seasons: The History of the NFL
- Algebra Smart
- AMA Family Medical Guide
- MovieWorks

== See also ==
- List of Windows software
- List of Macintosh software published by Microsoft
- List of Unix commands
