= Braveheart (disambiguation) =

Braveheart is a 1995 film directed by and starring Mel Gibson.

Braveheart, Brave Heart, Bravehearts or Brave Hearts may also refer to:

== Film and TV ==
- Braveheart (1925 film), a silent Western film
- Brave Hearts: Umizaru, a 2012 Japanese film
- A Brave Heart: The Lizzie Velásquez Story, a 2015 documentary film
- "Brave Heart" (House), an episode of the medical drama TV series House
- Brave Heart Lion, the leader of the Care Bear Cousins

== Music ==
- Bravehearts, an American East Coast hip hop group
- Braveheart (Ashanti album), 2014
- Braveheart (soundtrack), soundtrack to the 1995 film by James Horner
- Brave Heart (Kim Hill album), 1991
- Brave Heart (Thom Schuyler album), 1983
- Brave Heart (Wang Feng album), 2007
- "Braveheart" (song), a 2014 song by Neon Jungle
- "Brave Heart", a song in the 1999 anime Digimon Adventure by Ayumi Miyazaki
- "Brave Heart" (Megumi Hayashibara song), from the 2001 anime Shaman King
- "Brave Heart", a song by Scooters Union

== Other uses ==
- Braveheart (software)
- Braveheart (1999 video game)
- Brave Hearts BC, a Malawian basketball club
- Worcester Bravehearts, a summer collegiate baseball team based in Worcester, Massachusetts
- 75014 Braveheart, a preserved BR Standard Class 4 4-6-0 steam locomotive

== See also ==
- Cœurs Vaillants ("Brave Hearts"), a Catholic French-language newspaper for children (1929–1981)
- Braveheartbattle, an annual extreme sport event in Germany
