= List of Windows software =

The following is a list of Microsoft Windows software – notable computer applications for Windows operating system.

== List of Windows software ==
Software	Developer(s)	Release year
3DMark	MadOnion	1998
3D Kitchen	Books That Work	1995
3D Home Architect	Broderbund	1992
Adobe Atmosphere	Adobe Systems	2001
AAA Map 'n' Go	DeLorme	1994
Adventure Game Studio	Chris Jones	1997
Braveheart	Midisoft Corporation	1995
Comet Cursor	Comet Systems	1997
EmEditor	EmSoft	1997
GetRight	Headlight Software	1997
Hallmark Connections Card Studio	Micrografx	1995
Mickey's Stickers & Stuff Printing Fun Kit	Disney Interactive Avery Dennison	1997
Star Wars: Behind the Magic	LucasArts	1998
Street Finder	Rand McNally	1995
The Bat!	Ritlabs	1997

== See also ==
- List of Mac software
