= Avenir =

Avenir is the French word for "future".

Avenir may also refer to:

== Entertainment ==
- "Avenir" (song), a 2014 song by Louane Emera
- Avenir: Mirai, Kaori Iida's third studio album
- Avenir, a fictional company in the game Hyperdimension Neptunia
- Avenir, former name of StoryMill, a novel-writing application

== Organizations ==
- Avenir Suisse, a free-market think tank
- Avenir Telecom, a telecommunications company
- Avenir AS (no) - IT company from Norway
- Avenir Foundation, a charitable foundation run by descendants of Homer L. Dodge

== Other ==
- Avenir (given name), Russian male first name
- Avenir (typeface), a typeface designed by Adrian Frutiger
- Avenir, Alberta, Canada
- Buick Avenir, a concept car
- Nissan Avenir, an automobile

== See also ==
- L'Avenir (disambiguation)
