= Allie Brosh =

American blogger, writer and comic artist (born 1985)

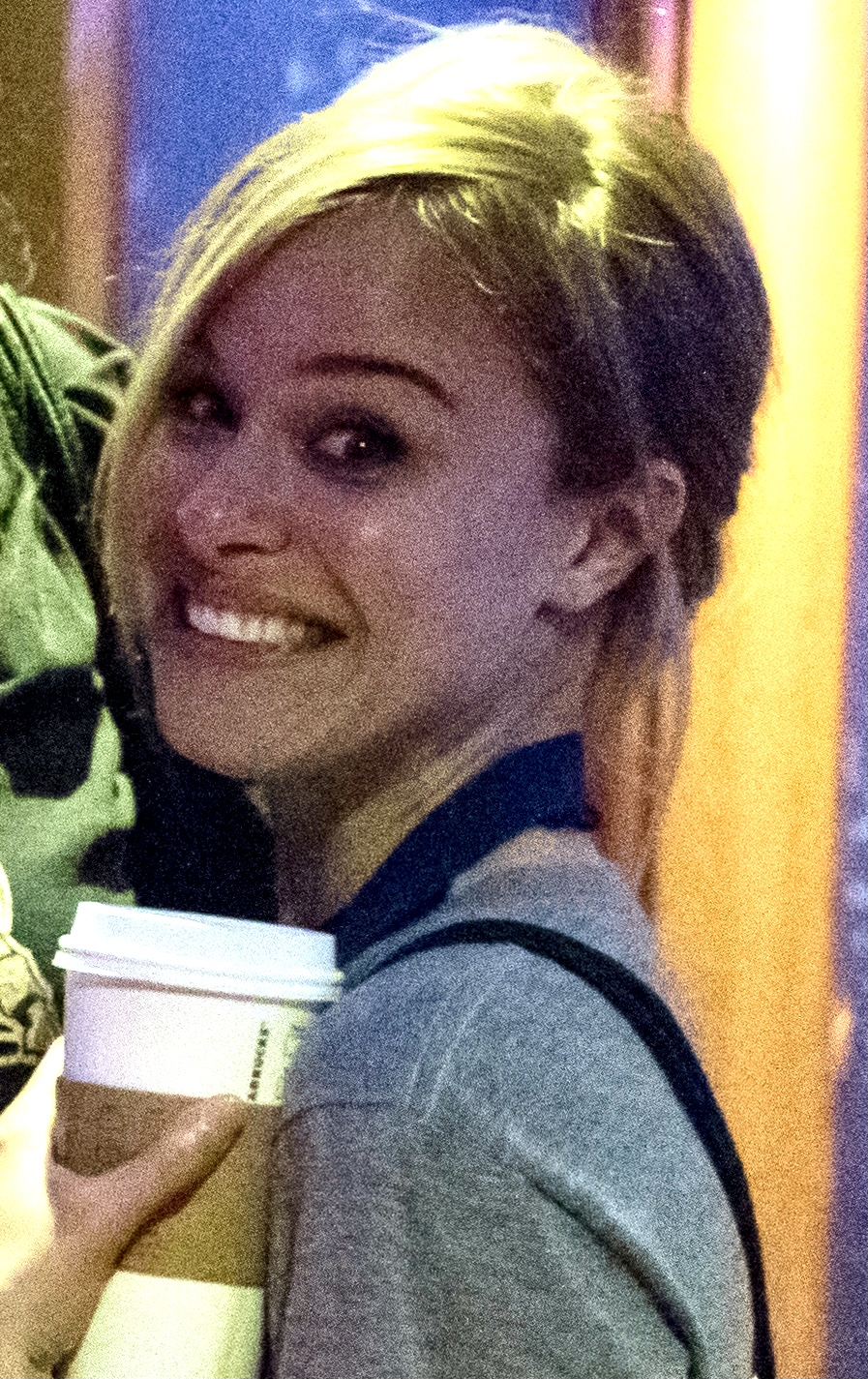
- Brosh in 2016
- Born: May 18, 1985 (age 41); Auburn, California, U.S.
- Education: University of Montana (BS)
- Writing career
- Notable work: Hyperbole and a Half

Alexandra Brosh (born May 18, 1985) is an American blogger, writer, and comic artist best known for Hyperbole and a Half, a blog and webcomic she created in 2009.

Brosh grew up in small towns across the U.S. and eventually attended the University of Montana. While there, Brosh started the Hyperbole and a Half blog. On the site, she told stories from her life using a mix of text and intentionally crude illustrations. She has published two books telling stories in the same style, both of which have been New York Times bestsellers.

Brosh lives with severe depression and ADHD, which have caused her to withdraw from the internet, her blog, and public appearances for several years on multiple occasions. Brosh's comics chronicling her experiences with depression have won praise from mental health professionals, professors, and philanthropists.

== Early life ==
Brosh was raised in Auburn, California, and Sandpoint, Idaho. In an interview with Mother Jones, she stated that these rural settings allowed her to "be a little bit weirder.”

When it comes to her writing, Brosh says that she wanted to be an author since she was at least eight years old, noting that her first real foray into book writing occurred when she was around nine or ten: "It was this epic monstrosity that filled three whole notebooks... the main plot was that there was a guy, and he fought lots of things. Anything I could think of – this guy fought it."

She graduated with a degree in human biology from the University of Montana, where she also participated in track. Brosh has ADHD, which she says was more severe when she was a child.

== Hyperbole and a Half blog ==
Brosh started Hyperbole and a Half in 2009 to avoid studying for her college physics final exam. The blog was fully active in 2009 and 2010. During this time, Brosh produced 79 and 78 posts respectively, uploading a new entry at least every few weeks. These posts generally focus on general humor (such as the “Spaghatta Nadle” character), describe Brosh's life (both recent events and childhood stories), or discuss her observations and opinions (such as her grammatical pet peeve of "a lot" being written as "alot").

In 2010, she said of her career as a writer, “With my crippling ADHD and impulsive decisions this is a perfect job for me. I make my own schedule." In 2011, Brosh reduced her output and created just five new posts. She later stated that this reduction was caused by her mental health issues, a serious medical condition, and pivoting to focus on her first book, which would be published in 2013.

The Hyperbole and a Half website has been described both as a blog and as a webcomic. Nearly all of Brosh's posts from 2009 are text-based and have no illustrations, though some include photographs from her home and childhood. In 2010, she started producing entries that are a mix of text and illustrations. She used Paintbrush software to draw the comic. Brosh compared her combination of text and illustrations to stand-up comedy, saying, "[my writing] was more one-dimensional than stand-up comedy, in which you can rely on tone and facial expressions, body posture. And I wanted to find some way to commit that to the page. Drawing fixed all of those problems."

The drawings, mainly stick figures that draw inspiration from rage comics, intentionally appear crude. Brosh says that she scrutinizes and refines all of these crude drawings to ensure they convey the proper energy and emotions, often doing 10 or more of each illustration and spending hours on facial expressions or body positions. Ultimately, Brosh said that each blog entry with illustrations takes around 24 hours to produce.

The character representing Brosh loosely resembles a stick-figure with a pink dress, with wide-grinning, unfocused eyes and a triangle-shaped ponytail sticking up which she jokingly calls a shark fin. The character sometimes wears a grey hoodie when particularly depressed. Brosh said in an interview, "I feel very awkward a lot, and so I want to represent myself with this awkward thing, this thing that doesn't quite look like a person. Maybe it looks like some sort of bug or some sort of alien, because that's how I feel."

=== Reception ===
Brosh first saw her work become popular when one of her posts was linked from Reddit and she found her blog getting "like 100 times more traffic than I'd ever had." Her recognition increased when a panel from one entry, which was captioned "clean all the things,” became an internet meme. By 2013, she had over 380,000 Facebook likes, around 72 million website views, and was getting five million unique visitors each month. In 2011 her blog was included in a list of the funniest sites by PC World, and in 2013 (the year her first book was published) Advertising Age put Brosh in its yearly list of "most influential and creative thinkers and doers".

== Depression and withdrawal ==
In October 2011, Brosh made a blog post entitled "Adventures in Depression" in which she revealed that she had severe depression. After that post, Brosh's blog was inactive for more than a year. In May 2013, she made a long follow-up post chronicling her struggle with depression and thoughts of suicide. Her site got 1.5 million visits in a day, and the number of supportive comments from people indicating that they were worried about her surprised her.

The two comics on depression became popular with people who could identify with her depiction of the mental disorder, and people who had never experienced depression said they understood it better. Her work was praised by critics and psychologists who appreciated her depiction of the illness. Jonathan Rottenberg, Associate Professor of Psychology at the University of South Florida, in Psychology Today, said, "I know of no better depiction of the guts of what it's like to be severely depressed." Brosh said seeing how people related to her work helped her: "Depression can be such an isolating experience, and it's deceptive, you know, you think, 'Surely I'm the only one that's ever gone through this, or felt this depth of misery.'"

== First book ==
According to The Globe and Mail, the success of the 2011 post "rocketed Brosh to serious virality, landing her a book deal." Brosh's first book, titled Hyperbole and a Half: Unfortunate Situations, Flawed Coping Mechanisms, Mayhem, and Other Things That Happened, was released in October 2013. It is written in the same style as her blog and includes some posts from the blog along with new stories. It was published by Touchstone, an imprint of CBS’s Simon & Schuster. The book's release was delayed as Brosh underwent major surgery for stage IV endometriosis. Brosh went on a six-city tour for the release, arranged by the publisher. She made appearances on radio and television and got support from fellow authors, including Elizabeth Gilbert. Before the book's publication, Brosh revealed its cover on Facebook and Twitter and participated in a marathon "ask-me-anything" session on Reddit.

Hyperbole and a Half sold more than 350,000 copies in one month. It was on The New York Times Best Seller list (Advice, How-To & Miscellaneous) for 12 weeks and on the NPR Paperback Nonfiction Bestseller List for 31 weeks. The book was the American Booksellers Association’s No. 1 pick for November, and it won a Goodreads Choice Award in the Humor category.

== Subsequent withdrawal and second book ==
After the first book's release, Brosh's online presence became sporadic again. After a tweet in November 2014, she disappeared again from social media and made no further updates or posts to her website. However, Brosh made a few public appearances. She appeared on WTF with Marc Maron in November 2014, on an episode of YouTube series Tabletop,on a Comic-Con panel in June 2015, and she gave a talk in 2016 on the JoCo Cruise.

In August 2015, she announced that she was working on a new book called Solutions and Other Problems. The release date was postponed a number of times, and by 2018 it was marked "unavailable" on Amazon. In June 2020, the book reappeared on Simon & Schuster's website with a new cover and updated page count and description. In September 2020, Brosh publicly announced the book with a new post on her blog. Solutions and Other Problems was released on September 22, 2020. It became a New York Times Bestseller (Advice, How-To & Miscellaneous), and as of November 1, 2020 it had been on the list for four weeks. Ailsa Chang of NPR said that what was most striking about the work is that Brosh ricochets between zany moments and sad moments within pages, and a key theme of the book is showing compassion to yourself.

== Personal life ==
As of 2013, Brosh lived in Bend, Oregon, with her husband, Duncan. She had married Duncan in December 2012, having been together for around eight years before that. In a post on Reddit in June 2020, Brosh said that since then she had divorced, then remarried, and that after moving around multiple states was living in Bend again. Brosh's younger sister Kaitlin, who had bipolar disorder, died in 2013. Brosh referred to her sister's death as a suicide. Brosh underwent major surgery for stage IV endometriosis in 2013.

Brosh has said that she "lives like a recluse". Brosh has been active on Reddit and has said that she likes it because it was the place where her first posts got popular. When asked if she feels an obligation to update readers on her health, she said, "I have been trying to make myself be more responsible. There's a part of me that wishes that I could sort of disappear and fade back into the mists when I need to. But I know that's not how reality works. I'm trying not to disappear for quite so long, or as completely".
