= LazPaint =

Free and open-source image editor

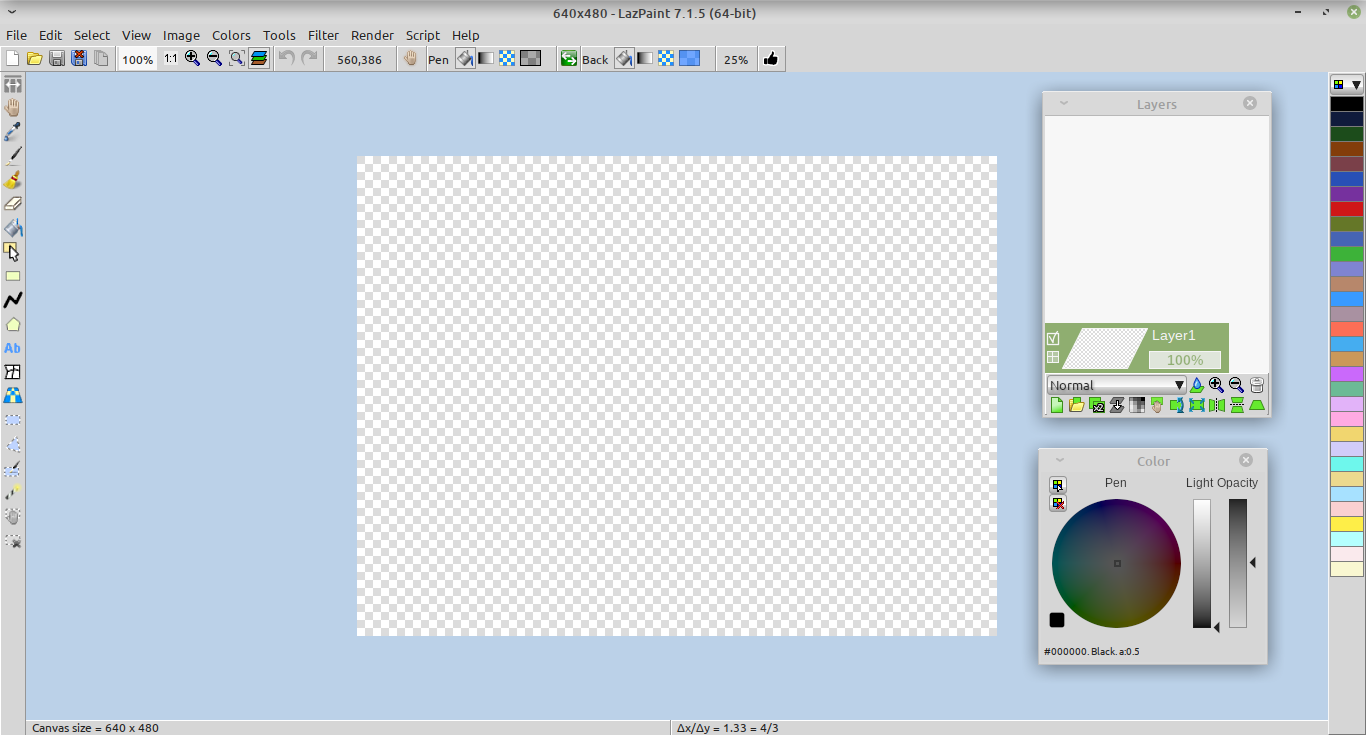
- The default window of LazPaint 7.1.5 64-bit, running on Linux Mint 20 Xfce
- Original author: circular
- Developer: circular helped by Lazarus community
- Initial release: February 2011; 14 years ago
- Stable release: 7.3 / 24 May 2025
- Repository: github.com/bgrabitmap/lazpaint
- Written in: Free Pascal
- Operating system: Windows XP and later, Linux, OS X
- Platform: native
- Size: 6.78 MB download
- Available in: Arabic, Bulgarian, Chinese, Czech, Dutch, German, English, French, Finnish, Italian, Japanese, Kabyle, Latvian, Polish, Portuguese, Russian, Spanish, Swedish
- Type: Raster graphics editor
- License: GPL-3.0-only
- Website: lazpaint.github.io

LazPaint is a free and open-source cross-platform (Note: LazPaint works on Linux, Windows and MacOS) lightweight image editor with raster and vectorial layers created with Lazarus. The software aims at being simpler than GIMP, is an alternative to Paint.NET and is also similar to Paintbrush.

Rendering is done with antialiasing and gamma correction. It can read/write usual image formats and interoperate with other layered editors via OpenRaster format. It also imports Paint.NET files (with their layer structure) and Photoshop files (as flattened images). Also, it can import 3D objects in Wavefront (.obj) format. There are complex selection functions, various filters and rendering of textures.

== Colorspace ==
Colors are stored in sRGB colorspace but drawing functions take into account gamma correction. There are many color manipulation functions such as shifting colors and colorizing. Since version 6, there is a curve adjustments function on RGBA channels and according to a corrected HSL colorspace. This correction takes into account the gamma factor and also perceived lightness according to the hue.

== Vector shapes ==
Since version 7, shapes are stored with vectorial information. Thus they are editable after they have been drawn and are rendered again in case of layer transform. Layers are converted when needed to raster or vector. If a tool like the pen is applied, the layer is rasterized and vectorial information becomes unavailable.

Filling can be a solid color, a gradient or a texture. It can apply to simple shapes, complex curves, text and shaded shapes.

== Releases ==
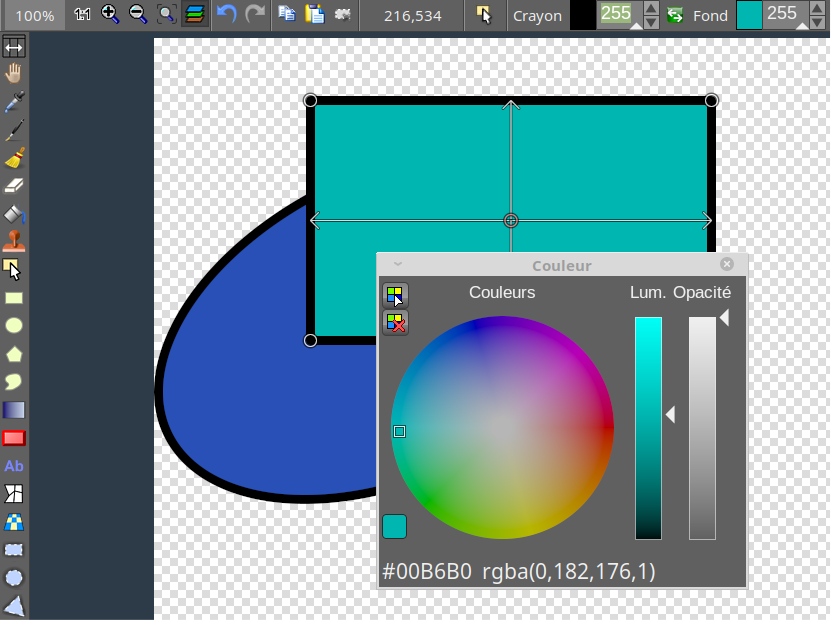
Selecting a vector shape

Version	Release date	Significant changes
1	6 February 2011	First release
2	21 February 2011	Add render water and Perlin noise, magic wand, polygonal selection, command line
3	2 April 2011	Render textures, twirl filter, resample filters
4.1	20 May 2011	Several spline styles, better clipboard transparency
4.4	2 April 2011	High DPI support, pixelate filter, text tool with outline and shadow
4.7	11 December 2011	Language choice, Phong shaded text, portable version
4.8	19 August 2012	Add texture mapping tool, import 3D objects, corrected HSL shift colors, selection mask edition
5.0	18 February 2013	Add support for raster layers, load Paint.NET layered images, read/write OpenRaster images
5.5	4 March 2013	Add Phong filter, filter function, blur computed in thread
5.6	23 March 2013	Add Easy Bézier curves
6.0	31 July 2014	Add image list, image browser, color curves adjustment, noise filter, posterize filter, print dialog, read flat PSD format, read/write TGA and TIFF
6.4.1	28 May 2016	Added brush and clone tool, palette, docking of toolbox, rain rendering, when saving show preview and choice of bit depth
7.0 beta	17 August 2019	Vector layers, edit shape tool, shape alignment, wave displacement filter, non-lossy transform of layers, zoom layer tool, edit frame of ICO / CUR / GIF, Lab colorspace support when reading TIFF
7.0.7	15 October 2019	Optimize saving of LZP images, add entry to multi-image files (GIF / TIFF), merge vector layers, right-click to rotate/shear shape, improvement of polygon editing
7.1.3	18 May 2020	Various bug fixes
7.1.4	7 October 2020	Optimize for MacOS with Retina display, magic wand progressive fill, optimize multiline text, show printed page count, Shift-Click to select or clone from other layers
7.1.5	19 October 2020	Image browser improvements, scaling fixes
7.1.6	2 December 2020	HSL blend modes, layered SVG read/write, detect dark theme, better Retina support, Qt5 support on Linux
