= Hyperbole and a Half =

Webcomic and comic book by Allie Brosh

- Website type: Comic and personal blog
- Owner: Allie Brosh
- Creator: Allie Brosh
- Website: hyperboleandahalf.blogspot.com
- Commercial: No
- Launched: 2009
- Current status: inactive

Hyperbole and a Half is a webcomic and blog written and illustrated by Allie Brosh. Started in 2009, Brosh often mixes text and illustrations to tell stories from her childhood, discuss her thoughts, and describe the challenges she has faced, particularly with mental health.

The illustrations are drawn in Paintbrush and use an exaggeratedly simple drawing style as an artistic device. Hyperbole and a Half draws inspiration from "rage comics," with shared diction and simple, almost rudimentary art. The blog principally ran in 2009 and 2010. During this time, Brosh produced 79 and 78 posts respectively, uploading a new entry at least every few weeks. In 2011, Brosh reduced her output and created just five new posts. She later stated that this reduction was caused by her mental health issues, a serious medical condition, and pivoting to focus on her book. There were some updates in 2013 and 2020, when Brosh was promoting her forthcoming books. As of 2025 the blog is inactive.

Two books based on the blog have made New York Times Bestseller lists, and the blog and books have received praise, particularly for their depiction of depression.

== Creation and updates ==
Brosh started Hyperbole and a Half in 2009 to avoid studying for her college physics final exam. She uses the Paintbrush software to draw the comic. When the blog was fully active, Brosh would upload a new entry every few weeks. In 2010, she said of her career as a writer, “With my crippling ADHD and impulsive decisions this is a perfect job for me. I make my own schedule."

In October 2011, Brosh made a blog post entitled "Adventures in Depression" in which she revealed that she had severe depression. After that post, Brosh's blog was inactive for more than a year. In May 2013, she made a long follow-up post chronicling her struggle with depression and thoughts of suicide. Her site got 1.5 million visits in a day, and the number of supportive comments from people indicating that they were worried about her surprised her. The two posts from 2011 and 2013 are the most popular on the site. After the release of a book based on the blog in October 2013, Brosh stopped updating the blog again.

In September 2020, Brosh publicly announced her new book, Solutions and Other Problems, with a new post on her blog, and in the same month posted a chapter from the book. As of January 2024, this sample chapter remains the latest post on the blog.

== Contents and style ==
Hyperbole and a Half has been described both as a blog and as a webcomic. According to Brosh, "Hyperbole and a Half is not really a web comic, but it isn't really a blog either. Basically, it has lots of pictures and words and it really tries hard to be funny.” Each blog post is a mix of text and illustrations describing her life. Several are about childhood stories, such as attending a children's birthday party while heavily sedated or becoming a monster after getting a dinosaur costume. Others are events or thoughts as an adult, such as attempting to move house despite her dogs' behavioral problems, speculation about her character flaws, a grammatical pet peeve ("a lot" written as "alot"), or her depression. Brosh compared her combination of text and illustrations to stand-up comedy, saying, "[my writing] was more one-dimensional than stand-up comedy, in which you can rely on tone and facial expressions, body posture. And I wanted to find some way to commit that to the page. Drawing fixed all of those problems."

The drawings, mainly stick figures which draw inspiration from rage comics, intentionally appear crude. Brosh scrutinizes and refines her drawings, often doing 10 or more of each illustration, spending hours on facial expressions or body positions. Brosh said that each blog entry took around 24 hours to produce. The character representing Brosh loosely resembles a stick-figure with a pink dress, with wide-grinning, unfocused eyes and a triangle-shaped ponytail sticking up which she jokingly calls a shark fin. The character sometimes wears a grey hoodie when particularly depressed. Brosh said in a 2020 interview, "I feel very awkward a lot, and so I want to represent myself with this awkward thing, this thing that doesn't quite look like a person. Maybe it looks like some sort of bug or some sort of alien, because that's how I feel."

Brosh also posted several YouTube videos; some were animated versions of her blog art style while others were video recordings of herself.

== Book adaptations ==
=== Hyperbole and a Half: Unfortunate Situations, Flawed Coping Mechanisms, Mayhem, and Other Things That Happened ===
In October 2013, Brosh published a book entitled Hyperbole and a Half: Unfortunate Situations, Flawed Coping Mechanisms, Mayhem, and Other Things That Happened. It is written in the same style as her blog and includes some posts from the blog along with new stories. It was published by Touchstone, an imprint of CBS's Simon & Schuster. The book's release was delayed as Brosh underwent major surgery for stage IV endometriosis. Brosh went on a six-city tour for the release, arranged by the publisher. She made appearances on radio and television and got support from fellow authors, including Elizabeth Gilbert. Before the book's publication, Brosh revealed its cover on Facebook and Twitter and participated in a marathon "ask-me-anything" session on Reddit.

Hyperbole and a Half sold more than 350,000 copies in one month. It was on The New York Times Best Seller list (Advice, How-To & Miscellaneous) for 12 weeks and on the NPR Paperback Nonfiction Bestseller List for 31 weeks. The book was the American Booksellers Association's No. 1 pick for November, and it won a Goodreads Choice Award in the Humor category. Zosia Bielskib from The Globe and Mail said of the book, "Brosh brings levity to many trademarks of depression, from emotional numbness to suicidal thoughts to paralysis around simple life tasks such as returning a DVD," and further called her an "unlikely poster girl for depression". Bill Gates praised her book, saying, "While she self-deprecatingly depicts herself in words and art as an odd outsider, we can all relate to her struggles. Rather than laughing at her, you laugh with her. It is no hyperbole to say I love her approach—looking, listening, and describing with the observational skills of a scientist, the creativity of an artist, and the wit of a comedian."

=== Solutions and Other Problems ===
First announced in 2015, Solutions and Other Problems was released on September 22, 2020. Published by Gallery Books, an imprint of Simon & Schuster, it covers subjects including a seven-hour surgery to remove tumors, her sister's suicide, her divorce, and her new marriage, as well as lighter subjects such as strange neighbor children, becoming a cat owner, and trying to understand the minds of animals.

It became a New York Times Bestseller (Advice, How-To & Miscellaneous), staying on the list for four weeks. Ailsa Chang of NPR said that what was most striking about the work is that Brosh ricochets between zany moments and sad moments within pages, and a key theme of the book is showing compassion to yourself. Caitlin Rosberg of The A.V. Club called the book a departure from the previous one, reflecting personal tragedy and profound change, saying "Her work has always been funny and full of empathy, but the depth of emotion is different, and the compassion and appreciation are more mature." Rosberg said that Brosh has refined and tightened her art style, telling complicated stories with minute changes in body language and expression. Dawn Fallik of The Washington Post said the book was "emotionally and physically hefty", noting its 515 pages.

== Reception ==
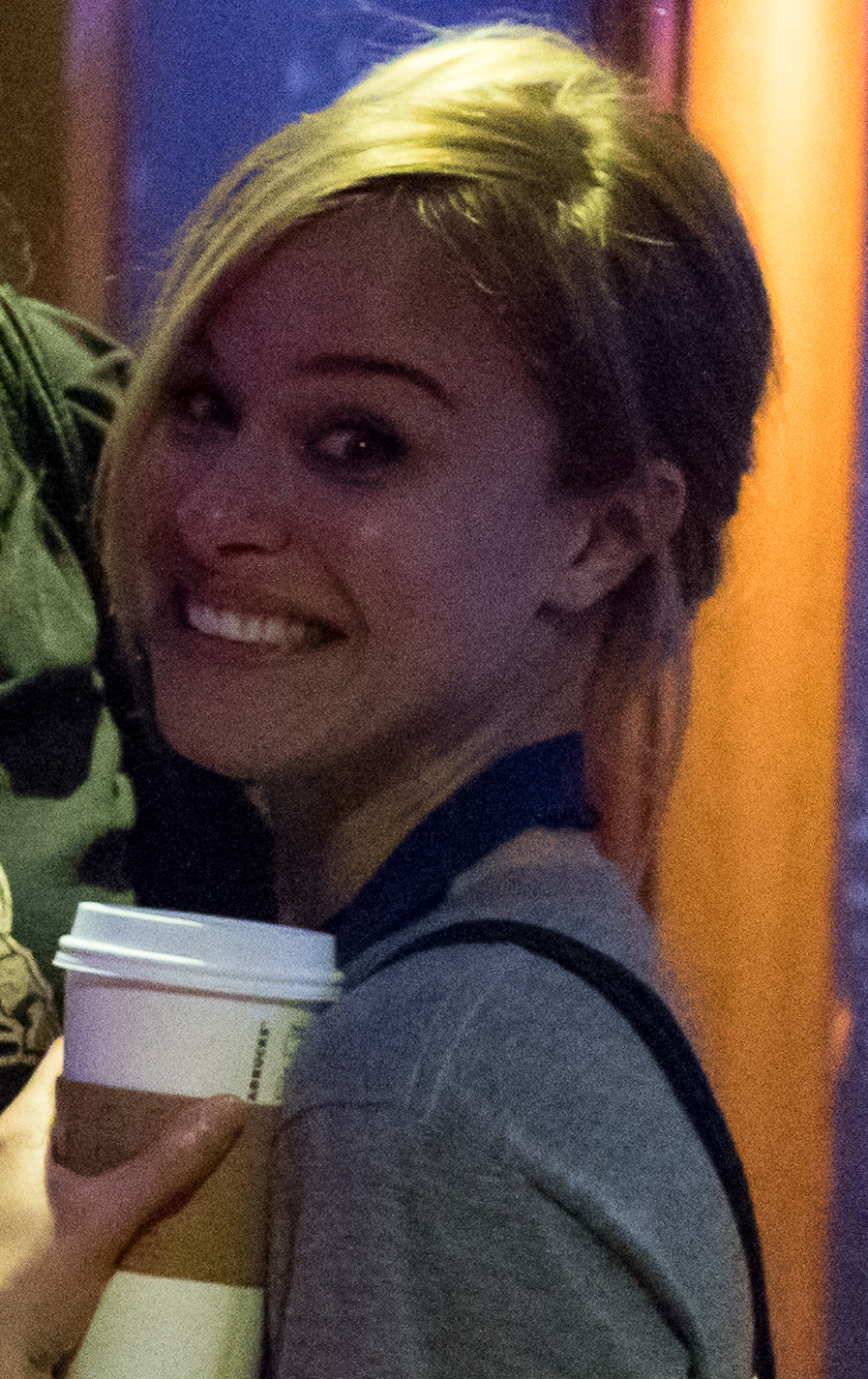
Allie Brosh in 2016

Brosh first saw her work become popular when one of her posts was linked from Reddit and she found her blog getting "like 100 times more traffic than I'd ever had." By 2013, she had over 380,000 Facebook likes and around 72 million website views and was getting five million unique visitors each month. In 2011 her blog was included in a list of the funniest sites by PC World, and in 2013 Advertising Age put Brosh in its yearly list of "most influential and creative thinkers and doers". A panel from one entry, captioned "clean all the things", became an internet meme.

Linda Holmes, from NPR, praised her work, saying "Brosh's posts are hugely evocative, gut-bustingly funny, and startlingly inventive in using simple drawings in ways that allow for pauses and comic timing" and compared her method of depicting "giddiness and anger" to Bill Watterson. Holmes further said how Brosh does not narrate her experiences as something that has happened rather, "She's in it, and she lives with it, and sometimes it's better, and sometimes it's worse. It means you don't see her for a while, because she's a real person and it's a real thing. You can wish her well, but she'll tell you she's not sure how it's going." Amy Dobek of the University of Missouri–Kansas City Library says that "it's not so much the stories themselves that are side-splittingly funny – it's the combination of her histrionic storytelling style and her primitively mad skills with MSPaint that put her, if I may say, over the top."

The two comics on depression from 2011 and 2013 became popular with people who could identify with her depiction of the mental disorder, and people who had never experienced depression said they understood it better. Her work was praised by critics and psychologists who appreciated her depiction of the illness. Jonathan Rottenberg, Associate Professor of Psychology at the University of South Florida, in Psychology Today, said, "I know of no better depiction of the guts of what it's like to be severely depressed." Ros Johnson, a Pawtucket, Rhode Island–based clinical social worker, said Brosh explains aspects which people who have the illness might find difficult to articulate, saying, "What she accesses and presents to other people is so clear and well-articulated, which is why it resonates". According to The Globe and Mail, the success of the 2011 post "rocketed Brosh to serious virality, landing her a book deal."
