= L'Avenir =

L'Avenir ("Future" in French) may refer to:

- L'Avenir, Quebec, municipality located in the Centre-du-Québec region of Quebec
- L'Avenir Ensemble, a political party in New Caledonia
- L'Avenir (France), a short lived Liberal Catholic newspaper published in France in the 1830s
- L'Avenir (Belgian newspaper), a French-language newspaper published in Namur, Belgium
- L'Avenir (Congolese newspaper), a French-language newspaper published in Kinshasa, the Democratic Republic of the Congo
- L'Avenir (Tonkin), magazine published in Tonkin, Vietnam
- L'Avenir (film), a French film
- L'Avenir, a 2020 novel published in English as The Future

== See also ==
- Admiral Karpfanger (barque), formerly the Belgian schoolship L'Avenir
- Avenir (disambiguation)
