= Mailbird =

Desktop email client software app

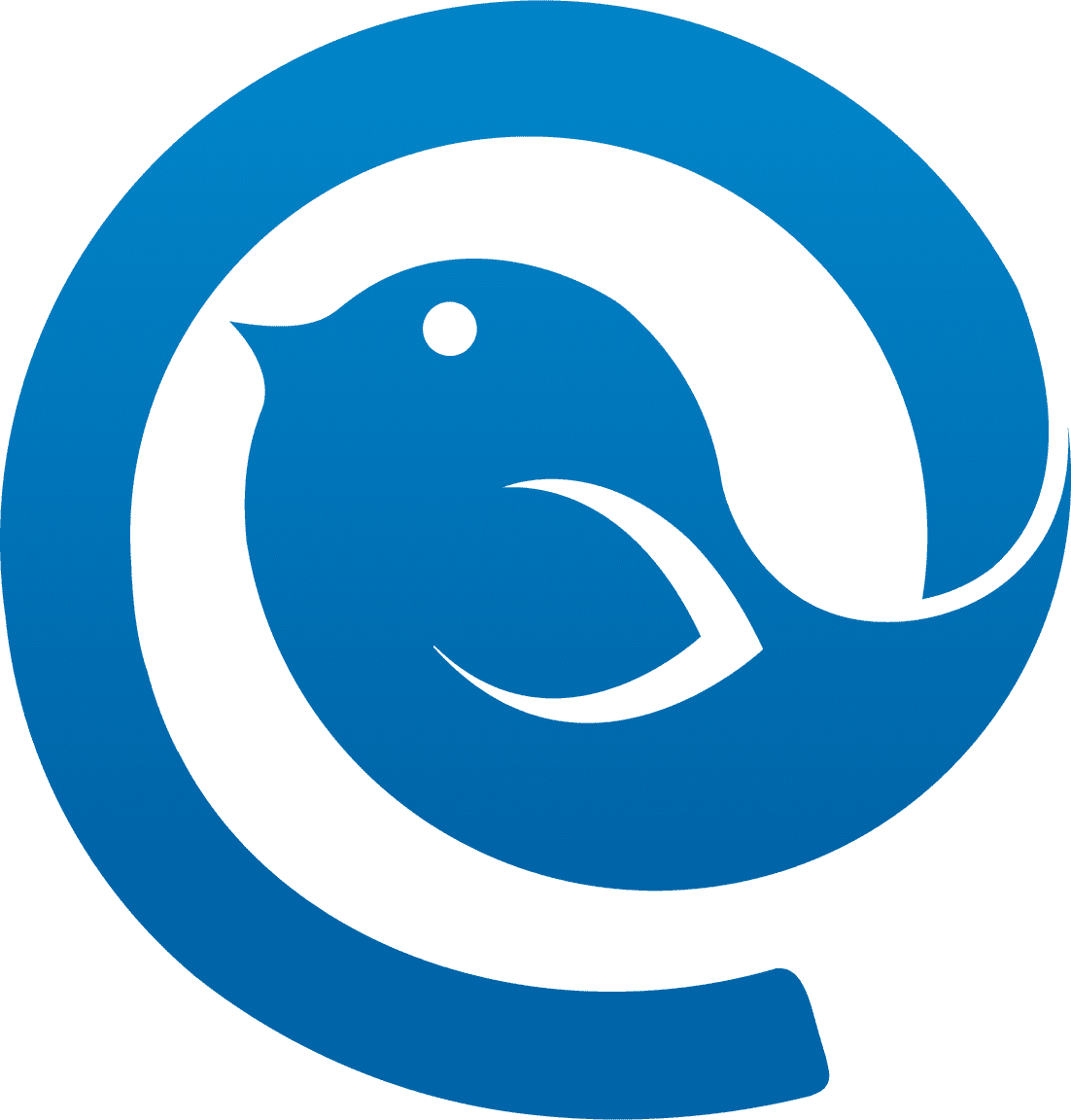
- Developers: Mailbird, Inc.
- Release: April 2, 2013; 13 years ago
- Stable release: 3.0.63.0 (Windows) 1.33.0 (macOS) / August 31, 2026; 21 days ago (Windows), September 12, 2026; 9 days ago (macOS)
- Operating system: Windows 10, Windows 11, macOS Ventura and higher
- Platform: .NET Framework Avalonia
- Available in: 24 languages
- List of languages Bulgarian, Catalan, Chinese (Mandarin), Czech, Danish, Dutch, Dutch (Belgium), English, French, French (Canada), German, Greek, Hungarian, Indonesian, Italian, Norwegian, Polish, Portuguese, Portuguese (Brazil), Romanian, Russian, Spanish, Spanish (Mexico), Swedish, Turkish
- Type: Email client
- License: Freemium
- Website: www.getmailbird.com

Mailbird is a desktop email client for Microsoft Windows and MacOS, compatible with Windows 10 and Windows 11, and with Ventura or higher for Mac devices. Mailbird is offered via a paid subscription, but also includes a free version for both Windows and Mac users.

== History ==
The first version of the Mailbird email software was created in January 2012 by Danish co-founders and serial entrepreneurs Michael Olsen and Michael Bodekaer, inspired by the lightweight Sparrow email client for OS X as an alternative to other existing email clients. Aside from the basic email features, the soft beta version included such features as the in-line reply, in-line attachment, a contact app, contacts search, PDF preview, keyboard shortcuts, quick reply, delete forever, etc.

In January 2013, Mailbird opened its beta to the public on an invite-only basis. The release included features, such as nested folder structure, message download, English spell check, and Lifehacker and TechCrunch integrations. Connecting additional email accounts also became possible along with the ability to set a default identity.

On January 27, 2014, Mailbird 1.0 was released to the public. This version had IMAP support, keyboard navigation, and multiple account support feature. Additionally, a Speed Reader, Contact Manager, POP support, and more languages for spell check were added.

By 2016, the app had been translated into several languages, including Hungarian and Chinese. Features, such as Undo Send, Import, Custom Cover were added, and the Contact Manager was updated.

On March 17, 2015, Mailbird 2.0 was released with new features, such as Email Snooze, Video Meetings, and Unified Inbox Plus. Further integrations were added for Facebook, WhatsApp, Twitter, Veeting Rooms, Asana, and more.

New integrations were later also added, such as Moodo, ZeroBounce and Google Drive. In 2019, Mailbird was updated with Filters/Rules functionality.

In 2020, new features were introduced, such as the Native Calendar, Advanced Search, and Moving Emails Between Accounts.

In 2022, Mexican Spanish was added as an additional supported language, and in 2023 ChatGPT was introduced as the latest available integration for any users who wish to leverage its technology directly from inside Mailbird.

On October 30, 2023, Mailbird 3.0 was released. It contained a wide range of new features and designs, along with a vast array of improvements to the overall user experience. Some examples of new features include Block Sender and Email Templates.

In early 2024, an integration for Sapling was added to Mailbird, allowing users to benefit from its writing assistant to improve grammar and spelling while using Mailbird. In July 2024, and Outlook Calendar app was also introduced, which works with both Hotmail and Outlook email accounts, as well as third party Exchange providers which support Outlook (such as GoDaddy's Exchange support).

Following an Early Access phase which ended on September 13, 2024, Mailbird released Mailbird Next (V. 1.0.3) on October 14, 2024.

== Features ==
Along with core functionalities which an email client offers, such as sending, receiving and managing emails, Mailbird offers a range of other features, such as Email Tracking, numerous app integrations for popular apps (e.g. ChatGPT, WhatsApp, Facebook, etc.), and support for Microsoft Exchange accounts. Mailbird supports IMAP and POP3 accounts from different email providers, such as Gmail, Outlook, Yahoo Mail, Hotmail, Exchange, etc. The calendar feature provides typical views by day, week, and month and can also be opened in the inbox sidebar.

Email Snooze provides users with an option to remove an email from the inbox for a set period of time. The snoozed email will return to the top of the inbox once a defined timer runs out. The Speed Reader feature shows the email text word-by-word on a blank screen. The speed can be adjusted. In-line reply is a default option in Mailbird that allows for adding comments to parts of an email. Comments are automatically highlighted, and the responder's name is added.

=== App integrations ===
Mailbird has a built-in browser that opens web applications inside its interface. The add-ons are organized inside a store-like section, in which the apps are installed by simply marking a checkbox.

- Chrome — enables in-app browsing.
- Degoo — cloud storage with AI technology.
- Dropbox — cloud-based storage.
- Evernote — web and desktop notepad.
- Feedly — application for news aggregation.
- Google services — Drive applications, Calendar, Hangouts, and Keep.
- Leave Me Alone - Remove email addresses from unsolicited mailing lists.
- Todoist — personal and team productivity management app.
- Messengers — WhatsApp, Facebook Messenger, WeChat, Twitter.
- Business blogs — TechCrunch, The Verge, Lifehacker, etc.
- Unroll.me — email subscription management.
- Asana — personal and team project management app.
- FollowUp.cc — Gmail integration for setting reminders and automatic replies.
- Slack — communication app for teams.

== Mailbird Next ==
On October 14, 2024, Mailbird released its first public version of its macOS email client, called Mailbird for Mac (later renamed Mailbird Next). Built using Avalonia's open source framework, Mailbird Next license owners currently have access to features such as:

- Unified Inbox / multi-account inbox
- IMAP and Microsoft Exchange protocol support
- Gmail, Outlook, Yahoo, iCloud and customer email account support
- Native Calendar app
- External Calendar integration (Google Calendar and Microsoft Calendar)
- Native Contacts app
- Attachment search
- Snooze
- Email tracking
- Alias Email Accounts
- Signature Generator
- Dark Mode
- Undo Send
- Account color coding / account organization
- Email Templates (known as 'Snippets')
- Group/Ungroup Messages by Conversation
- Block Sender
- AI-powered email writing or reply assistance
- ChatGPT integration
