= StoryMill =

- Original author(s): Todd Ransom
- Developer(s): Mariner Software
- Initial release: 2006 (Avenir)
- Stable release: 4.0.5 / 2011-10-28
- Operating system: Mac OS X
- Available in: English, French, German, Italian.
- Type: text editor, personal information manager
- License: proprietary
- Website: http://www.marinersoftware.com/sitepage.php?page=127

StoryMill (originally Avenir) is a text editor designed for fiction writers. It provides scene, chapter and character management capabilities along with the ability to annotate text and a claimed industry-first timeline view.

Avenir was developed by Todd Ransom, of Return Self Software, who also developed Montage, a Mac screenwriting application, for Mariner Software. From version 3, Avenir is being "republished" by Mariner, as StoryMill.
