= CDWinder =

Digital asset management software

- Developer(s): Andreas H. Becherer
- Stable release: 6.0.2 / April 23, 2012; 13 years ago
- Operating system: Windows
- Type: Digital asset management
- License: Shareware
- Website: www.cdwinder.de

CDWinder is an application for Microsoft Windows developed by Andreas H. Becherer since 2000. It is now known as abeMeda.

The software is a digital asset management utility, which offers a wide variety of meta data that is being read while cataloging a disk or data folder. It is part of a cross-platform media asset management solution together with CDFinder for Apple's Mac OS X.

CDWinder is available as shareware, which will allow you to catalog 25 disks or folders, but use all other features as long as you want.
