= MacScan =

Anti-malware software for macOS

- MacScan running on Mac OS X v10.4
- Developers: SecureMac.com, Inc.
- Release: 2016
- Stable release: 3.3 / March 12, 2020
- Operating system: macOS
- Type: Spyware removal software
- License: Shareware
- Website: www.securemac.com/macscan

MacScan is anti-malware software for macOS developed by SecureMac.

== Features ==
SecureMac runs on Apple macOS. It scans for and removes malware (including spyware, Trojan horses, keystroke loggers, and tracking cookies). It also scans for remote administration programs, like Apple Remote Desktop, allowing users to verify that such programs are installed only with their authorization.

The full version is available as shareware.

Unlike other anti-malware applications available for Mac OS X (and other systems), MacScan scans exclusively for malware that affects Macs, as opposed to scanning for all forms of known threats, which would include Windows malware. Given that there is considerably less macOS malware than Windows-based malware, MacScan's definition files are smaller and more optimized.

== See also ==
- List of Macintosh software
