= AAA Map 'n' Go =

Mapping software

- Developer: DeLorme
- Release: 1994
- Operating system: Windows
- Type: Mapping

AAA Map 'n' Go is a mapping platform from DeLorme. It was first released in 1994 as simply Map 'n' Go. For version 2.0, DeLorme partnered with the American Automobile Association (AAA) to license its TourBook travel guide and renamed the software to AAA Map 'n' Go. It was the first mapping software capable of connecting to the Internet for continuously updated travel information.

== Development ==
AAA Map 'n' Go was first released in 1994, as simply Map 'n' Go. It was renamed to AAA Map 'n' Go for version 2.0, which was released in 1996. Version 2.0 added the ability to connect to the Internet to provide continuously updated travel information. It was the first mapping software to have the ability to connect to the Internet. It was also the first to license the TourBook travel guide from the American Automobile Association (AAA), providing a database of over 57,000 points of interest, including restaurants, lodging, and campgrounds. Version 7.0 was released in 2001.

== Reception ==
Reviewing version 2.0, CNET said, "if most of your travel will be on state highways and interstates, this is a great vacation planner. Along with Microsoft's Automap Road Atlas and Rand McNally's Tripmaker, AAA Map 'n' Go 2.0 is a fine tool for long trips".

PC Magazine said "Simple to use with excellent connectivity, AAA Map 'n' Go is the leader in trip-planning software".

The software ranked 15th on PC Data's list of Top-Selling Personal Productivity Software for July 1997.

AAA Map 'n' Go won PC Magazine's Editors' Choice award. It was also a finalist in the Best Text or Graphics Business Software Program category in the 1997 CODiE Awards.
