= Street Atlas USA =

Mapping platform

- Developer: DeLorme
- Release: 1991
- Operating system: Windows; Macintosh
- Type: Mapping

Street Atlas USA is a mapping platform created by DeLorme. Originally released in 1991, it was both the first consumer mapping software available on CD-ROM and the first mapping software to offer detailed street maps of the entire United States on one disc.

== Summary ==
Street Atlas USA contains map information of each of the 50 states down to the street level. Each version has complete, detailed coverage of the streets of the United States (as of the date of its publication).

== Versions ==
- Street Atlas USA 3.0
- Street Atlas USA 4.0
- DeLorme Street Atlas USA 2006

DeLorme dropped support for Macintosh computers in 2002 after announcing that they would not develop Street Atlas USA for Mac OS X.

== Reception ==
Los Angeles Times called Street Atlas USA well worth its slightly higher price.

Street Atlas USA ranked 11th on PC Data's list of Top Selling Software for July 1997.
