= Journler =

Open-source hybrid diary and personal information manager for Macintosh

- Original author: Philip Dow
- Initial release: 24 May 2005; 21 years ago
- Stable release: 2.6b4 / 3 August 2011; 14 years ago
- Operating system: OS X
- Platform: Macintosh
- Type: wiki-like personal information manager
- License: open source
- Website: web.archive.org/web/20150428005219/http://www.getsprouted.com:80/applications/journler/
- Repository: github.com/phildow/Journler

Journler was an open-source hybrid diary and personal information manager for Macintosh. It featured a three-pane interface and supported tagging and categorizing of entries. The entries could be rich text, but also could contain images, PDFs, and other media that macOS supports. It was oriented toward chronological organization of entries, as in a diary or journal, and had a built-in calendar. Later versions aimed to be a flexible tool for personal project management and for fans of the Getting Things Done system.

Like many recent OS X applications, Journler supported smart folders that can automatically update themselves based on some user-delimited criteria. Journler allowed nesting of folders, including smart folders, under one another, which is more unusual. Its support for easy creation of hyperlinks between entries, with automatic backlinks, allowed it to be used as a personal wiki.

Journler was originally created by Philip Dow to meet his own needs. In September 2009, Dow announced he would cease development on Journler. In February 2011, it was announced that Journler would be open sourced. The source code is currently hosted on GitHub.

The final official release runs perfectly in OS X Snow Leopard, but degrades subsequently (mainly through the media browser - by which pictures and other media could be incorporated into entries - ceasing to function due to changes in Mac OS); even without the browser, Journler will run as far as OS X Sierra, but does not function from OS X 10.13 onwards.

In August 2015, Journler's creator wrote an article citing Howard Rheingold's 1985 book Tools for Thought and John Markoff's 2005 book What the Dormouse Said, and explaining how he has come to understand Journler as a "tool for thought" in a tradition of computer-assisted intelligence augmentation dating back to computer science pioneers Vannevar Bush, J. C. R. Licklider, and Douglas Engelbart.

== See also ==
- List of Macintosh software
- List of wiki software
- Personal knowledge base
