= TinkerTool =

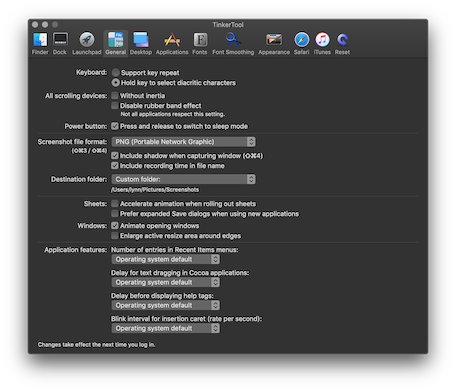
- TinkerTool running on macOS Mojave with its General pane open
- Release: December 7, 2010
- Stable release: 11.7 / 6 July 2026; 30 days ago
- Operating system: macOS
- Available in: Multilingual
- Type: Utilities
- License: Freeware
- Website: www.bresink.com/osx/TinkerTool.html

TinkerTool is a freeware application for macOS that provides a graphical user interface (GUI) to change settings that are normally hidden, thereby allowing the user to customise the system. It is developed by German developer Marcel Bresink Software-Systeme. Its latest release is version 10.2.

== Features ==
TinkerTool gives users access to hidden system and application settings that Apple has built into macOS, but not integrated into GUI settings menus. Although users can typically access these through Terminal operations, TinkerTool assembles them and provides a GUI similar to Apple’s System Settings application for easier access.

By using Apple’s hidden settings, the application only makes changes that are reversible; it also only affects the account of the user running TinkerTool. Administrative privileges and background processing are not required. The application also can reset all settings to Apple's defaults, or to the state that existed before using the application.

== History ==
Initially, TinkerTool worked with all versions of macOS. However, over the years, compatibility with particular versions of macOS was spun off into separate applications: TinkerTool Classic, TinkerTool Classic Generation 2, TinkerTool 4, TinkerTool 5, TinkerTool 6, and the current TinkerTool. Support therefore goes back to Mac OS X 10.1 Puma and later.

== Versions ==
TinkerTool versions are specific to versions of macOS and are not backward compatible. The program will not work correctly if used with an OS for which it was not designed.

Tinker Tool Version Overview
Name of special TinkerTool version	For operating systems	Current Version
Tinker Tool 1.1.2 (Historical Edition)	Mac OS X Public Beta	1.1.2
Tinker Tool 1.5.2 (Historical Edition)	Mac OS X 10.0 Cheetah	1.5.2
Tinker Tool Classic	Mac OS X 10.1 Puma Mac OS X 10.2 Jaguar Mac OS X 10.3 Panther	3.95
Tinker Tool Classic Generation 2	Mac OS X 10.4 Tiger Mac OS X 10.5 Leopard	4.5
Tinker Tool 4	Mac OS X 10.6 Snow Leopard Mac OS X 10.7 Lion OS X 10.8 Mountain Lion	4.97
Tinker Tool 5	OS X 10.9 Mavericks OS X 10.10 Yosemite OS X 10.11 El Capitan	5.7
Tinker Tool 6	macOS 10.12 Sierra macOS 10.13 High Sierra	6.5
Tinker Tool 7	macOS 10.14 Mojave macOS 10.15 Catalina	7.6
Tinker Tool 8	macOS 11 Big Sur macOS 12 Monterey	8.6
Tinker Tool 9	macOS 13 Ventura macOS 14 Sonoma	9.81
Tinker Tool 10	macOS 15 Sequoia	10 or later
Tinker Tool	macOS 26 Tahoe	11 or later

The current build is actively maintained. However, all previous versions in support of past operating systems are still available for download from the developer's website.

== See also ==
- OnyX
