= L'Avenir (Tonkin) =

L'Avenir (French pronunciation: [lavniʁ], lit. 'The Future') was a bimonthly magazine published in Tonkin, launched in March 1936. L'Avenir was the organ of the Vietnamese branch of SFIO. The staff of l'Avenir included Võ Nguyên Giáp, Phan Anh, Dang Thai Mai, Vu Dinh Huynh and Bui Ngoc Ai.
