= 3D Kitchen =

- Developer: Books That Work
- Release: October 17, 1995
- Operating system: Windows

3D Kitchen is a CD-ROM software from Books That Work.

== Summary ==
3D Kitchen lets users experiment with colors, patterns, textures, lighting and shading in a kitchen they design. It contains tips from designers who are certified by the National Kitchen & Bath Association.

== Development ==
3D Kitchen was developed by Books That Work, a company founded in 1992.

== Reception ==
CNET said "3D Kitchen is hot stuff. Of course, some people may be disappointed that it won't take care of the cooking once their new kitchen is built, but we wouldn't be surprised if the clever people at Books That Work are already working on that revision". PC Magazine called 3D Kitchen a well-rounded, intuitive package.

3D Kitchen was a finalist in the Best Home Creativity Software Program category in the 1996 CODiE Awards.
