= Avenir, Alberta =

Coordinates: 55°02′26″N 112°16′51″W

Location of Avenir in Alberta

Avenir is an unincorporated community in Alberta, Canada. It has an elevation of 1,952 feet.
