= Seashore (software) =

Raster graphics editor for macOS

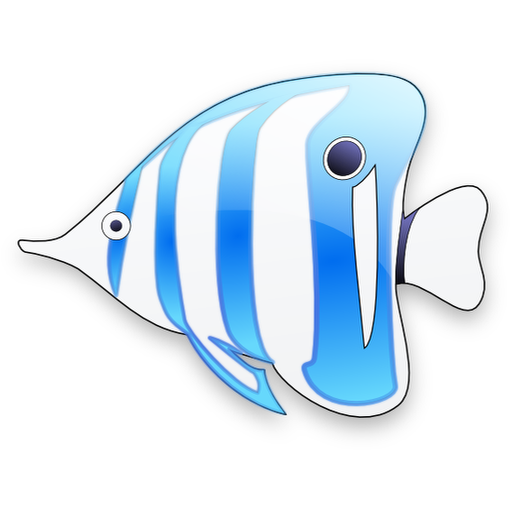
- Original author: Mark Pazolli
- Developer: Robert Engels
- Initial release: 16 January 2003; 23 years ago
- Stable release: 3.41 / 4 August 2025; 7 months ago
- Written in: Objective-C
- Operating system: macOS
- Type: Raster graphics editor
- License: GPL-2.0-only
- Website: AppStore
- Repository: github.com/robaho/seashore

Seashore is a free and open-source image editor designed specifically for macOS, similar to Photoshop/GIMP, with a simpler user interface. Seashore uses GIMP's native file format, XCF, and has support for a handful of other graphics file formats, including full support for TIFF, PNG, JPEG, JPEG2000, and HEIC and read-only support for BMP, PDF, SVG and GIF. Seashore offers fewer features than Photoshop/GIMP, but is intended to be easy to use and to run natively on macOS. It includes layers, alpha channel support, gradients and transparency effects, anti-aliased brushes, tablet support and plug-in filters.

After several years without maintenance, development was restarted by Robert Engels in 2017 to allow it to run on newer versions of macOS. Seashore version 3.41 was released in August 2025 and is considered stable.

The latest release is distributed via the Apple Mac App Store.

== Features ==
Seashore has many of the basic features found in graphics editing software, including:

- Full support for the XCF file format
- Reading and writing TIFF, PNG, GIF, JPEG, JPEG 2000 and HEIC file formats
- Reading BMP, PDF, SVG, PICT, and XBM file formats
- Layers and layer merging effects
- Text layers
- Individual editing of layer channels
- Transparency effects and transparency in gradients
- Arbitrary selection regions (i.e. through a lasso tool)
- Anti-aliased paint brushes
- User defined brushes and textures
- 6 gradient effects
- Graphics tablet support
- Plug-in filter effects
- Core Image Filters
- Color levels and histograms

== See also ==
- GIMP
- Pixelmator
- Paintbrush
- Comparison of raster graphics editors
