= DaisyDisk =

Paid disk space analyzer for macOS

- DaisyDisk running on macOS
- Developer: Software Ambience
- Initial release: 2008
- Stable release: 4.33.1 (January 5, 2026; 40 days ago) [±]
- Operating system: macOS
- Available in: English, German, French, Italian, Russian, Simplified Chinese, Traditional Chinese, Japanese, Swedish, Spanish, Polish
- Type: Disk space analyzer
- Website: daisydiskapp.com

DaisyDisk is a paid disk space analyzer for macOS. It displays a sunburst diagram of files on a hard drive to help with the location or deletion of large files. It can display previews of files using Quick Look. It also allows the user to look at the file directly in Finder, in order to delete it or move it elsewhere.

== History ==
DaisyDisk was started in late 2008 by interaction designer Taras Brizitsky and programmer Oleg Krupnov. They built the codebase from scratch to try to achieve higher speeds than similar programs. They decided to use a sunburst diagram as it is perceived better than other ways of visualizing data (such as treemaps).

== Features ==
DaisyDisk needs to scan the disk to create a map of its files and folders. Once the initial scan is completed, DaisyDisk doesn't keep displayed information up to date and reflects only changes to disk made through interaction with DaisyDisk. DaisyDisk can scan multiple disks in parallel.

With v4.5 of DaisyDisk, support for APFS was added.

=== Interface ===
DaisyDisk displays the contents as a color-coded sunburst diagram, resembling the petals of a daisy. The interface places the root of the hard drive at the center of this daisy, and displays a hierarchical structure of that hard drive's file system that radiates from that center. This daisy is color-coded to differentiate between folders, while files themselves are always displayed as gray. In the right sidebar of the interface, DaisyDisk also provides a legend for these color codes. When hovering over a file or folder, the right sidebar of the interface updates with contextual information such as the file or folder name and their absolute path. When clicking on a folder on the daisy, a new daisy is displayed with the chosen folder as its root. The interface shows a "breadcrumb trail" of the current folder right above the sunburst diagram.

DaisyDisk provides a Trash-like collector icon in the lower left of its interface where files and folders can be dragged and dropped for deletion.

As of DaisyDisk v3, a specialized version of the app exists for Mac users with Retina Displays.

=== Integration ===
One of the ways DaisyDisk integrates with the Mac features is through its support of the Quick Look function, which is included in Mac OS X v10.5 "Leopard" and later. Hovering over any file or folder in DaisyDisk's interface and pressing space bar utilizes Quick Look and displays additional information about that file or folder in regards to its location and contents.

== See also ==
- Disk space analyzer
- Sunburst diagram
