= FlowVella =

- Company type: Private
- Website type: Presentation tool
- Available in: English
- Key people: Brent Brookler co-founders
- Website: https://www.flowvella.com/
- Launched: April 2013
- Current status: active

FlowVella (formerly Flowboard) is an interactive presentation platform that includes an iPad/iPhone app, a Mac app and web site for viewing presentations, built first for the iPad and web. FlowVella allows users to create, publish and share presentations through their cloud-based SaaS system. FlowVella allows embedding of text, images, PDFs, video and gallery objects in easy linkable screens, defining modern interactive presentations. FlowVella grew out of Treemo Labs.

== History ==
FlowVella launched as 'Flowboard' on April 18, 2013 after being built for almost a year. FlowVella was incubated out of Treemo Labs, which had years of experience building native apps for iPhone, iPad and Android devices. FlowVella is an iPad app and Mac app where users create, view, publish and share interactive presentations. Presentations are viewable on flowvella.com through a web-based viewer on any device or through the FlowVella native iPad app or Mac app.

On December 18, 2014, Flowboard rebranded as FlowVella after a trademark dispute.

== Presentation format ==
FlowVella is an interactive presentation format where instead of single directional slides, presentations are made up of linkable screens with embeddable media and content objects. While 'Flows' can be exported to PDF, they all have a web address and are meant to be viewed via a web browser or the FlowVella native applications.

== Revenue model ==
FlowVella uses the freemium model for its presentation apps. Free users can make 4 public presentations with limited number of screens/slides, but most features are available to try out the software. In 2016, FlowVella introduced a second paid plan called PRO which includes team sharing, tracking and newly introduced 'Kiosk Mode' that launched in March 2017.

== Features ==
FlowVella is a native iPad app and Mac app which has advantages over web based tools. All downloaded presentations can be viewed offline, without an Internet connection. This includes videos which are enabled by caching the video files into memory. For students, teachers, sales people and all users, this is extremely important because this prevents having a presentation fail because of lack of an Internet connection. Beyond the offline capabilities, there is a trend to build native applications versus HTML5 as noted by Facebook and LinkedIn both rebuilding their mobile apps as 100% native applications.
