= TourBook =

Brand name of a United States travel guide series

A 2009 TourBook covering three New England states

TourBook is the brand name of a series of United States travel guides published by the American Automobile Association (AAA). The books are published annually in editions that cover one to five states each (depending on size). Editions covering Canadian provinces are also available and created in association with the Canadian Automobile Association (CAA). Additional TourBooks have been published for Mexico and the Caribbean. TourBooks are free to AAA and CAA members.

TourBooks provides an overview of each state or province, followed by detailed travel information for each state or province, organized by city. The books provide listings of major attractions, lodging, and restaurants. Highlighted attractions are identified with a "GEM" icon ("Great Experience for Members"). Most lodging and restaurants are rated using AAA's "Diamond" system, from one to five, with "one diamond" indicating basic but adequate facilities and service and "five diamond" being reserved for the highest levels of luxury and elegance. Some establishments forgo AAA rating but are included for completeness.
