= ZeroBounce =

Global email services company

- Type: LLC
- Industry: Email marketing
- Founded: 2015; 11 years ago
- Founders: Liviu Tanase
- Headquarters: Santa Barbara, US
- Area served: Global
- Key people: Liviu Tanase (CEO) Brian Minick (COO) Paul Pintilescu (CTO) Dan Cotet (CPO)
- Number of employees: 88
- Website: www.zerobounce.net

ZeroBounce, the trading name of Herza LLC, is a software company specializing in email address validation and deliverability. The ZeroBounce email validation and deliverability platform checks whether email addresses are real, active, and safe before sending, helping to prevent emails from bouncing, being classified as spam, or from being filtered in transit by ISPs and other operators. It does this through a multi-step technical verification process, before categorizing each address (e.g. valid, invalid, spam trap) and enriching it with extra data like AI quality scores.

Over 650,000 customers use ZeroBounce tools for cleaning email lists, warming sending domains, monitoring blacklists and DMARC records.

== Company history ==
ZeroBounce was formed by Liviu Tǎnase in 2015, becoming fully operational in 2017. In September of the same year, ZeroBounce became a Better Business Bureau Accredited Business.

In December 2017, ZeroBounce joined the EU-US and Swiss-US Data Privacy Framework.

In 2019, ZeroBounce ranked 851 on the Inc. 5000 list of the fastest-growing companies in the United States of America.

In 2020, the ZeroBounce service was expanded to include an email server tester, an inbox placement tester and a blacklist monitoring tool to further improve message delivery for clients. The same year, ZeroBounce reached No. 40 on the Inc. 5000 list. The company recorded a 7000% growth in revenue over three years.

In 2021, ZeroBounce was ranked No. 9 on the Inc. Regionals Southeast list, and No. 487 on the Inc. 5000 list. CEO Liviu Tanase was also honoured with a place on the Forbes Next 1000 list. The company was reportedly serving over 125,000 corporate clients.

On 22 March 2022, ZeroBounce completed SOC 2 Type 2 audit and certification for the first time.

On August 24, 2022, ZeroBounce achieved ISO/IEC 27001:2013 certification. This was upgraded to the ISO/IEC 27001:2022 certification on 24 July 2026.

In 2022, ZeroBounce reached No 52 on the Inc. Regionals list, and No. 1954 on the Inc. 5000 list. That same year, the company was named an Inc. Power Partner, an annual award honoring the best B2B companies worldwide.

By July 2024, ZeroBounce was reported to have in excess of 325,000 corporate customers.

By 2026, the ZeroBounce user base was estimated to be between 400,000 and 500,000 seats.
