= NeoFinder =

Application for Apple's Mac OS X

- Developer(s): Norbert M. Doerner
- Stable release: 7.7 / December 2, 2020; 4 years ago
- Operating system: Mac OS X
- Type: Digital asset management
- License: Demoware
- Website: www.cdfinder.de

NeoFinder is an application for Apple's Mac OS X developed by Norbert M. Doerner since 1995. It was formerly known as CDFinder.

The software is a digital asset management utility, which offers a wide variety of music, photo, video, and other meta data, including thumbnails and XMP (Adobes Extensible Metadata Platform), that is being read while cataloging a disk or data folder, and has many workflow integrations, such as with Roxio Toast, FileMaker, or Adobe Bridge.

NeoFinder also supports cataloging of geotagged photos, a geo search, and can add GPS tags to photos.

NeoFinder is available as demoware, which lets you to catalog 25 disks, but use all other features as long as you want.

There is also a version available for Windows, since 2000, called abeMeda, formerly known as CDWinder. abeMeda is developed by Andreas H. Becherer. abeMeda uses the same catalog data format and offering the same functionality as NeoFinder.
