= Braveheart (1999 video game) =

1999 video game

- Developer: Red Lemon Studios
- Publisher: Eidos Interactive
- Platform: Windows
- Release: EU: July 23, 1999; NA: August 13, 1999
- Genres: Strategy, real-time strategy
- Modes: Single-player, multiplayer

Braveheart is a video game based on the film of the same name. It was developed by Scottish studio Red Lemon Studio and published by Eidos Interactive for Windows in 1999.

== Gameplay ==
Braveheart is a mix of elements from classic strategy games with the realtime strategy genre. The game is split between a high-level Planning mode and a Realtime 3D mode. In Planning mode, players oversee towns, maneuver armies across the map, and engage in diplomacy. When battles occur—or when inspecting a settlement more closely—the game shifts into Realtime 3D mode, allowing players to view and command conflicts on the ground.

== Development ==
Braveheart was developed in nearly two years time.

== Reception ==
Reception

Aggregate score
Aggregator	Score
GameRankings	51%

Review scores
Publication	Score
CNET Gamecenter	4/10
Computer Games Strategy Plus	1.5/5
Computer Gaming World	2/5
Edge	8/10
GamePro	2/5
GameRevolution	B−
GameSpot	5.1/10
GameZone	5.7/10
IGN	4.2/10
Next Generation	2/5
PC Accelerator	4/10
PC Gamer (UK)	90%

The game received mixed reviews according to the review aggregation website GameRankings. Adam Pavlacka of NextGen said, "On paper, Braveheart sounds great. In reality, however, it's a convoluted attempt at a game that's more work than play."
