= BeaTunes =

Proprietary music software

beaTunes
- Developer: tagtraum industries incorporated
- Release: August 2006; 19 years ago
- Operating system: Mac OS X, Microsoft Windows
- Available in: English, German, Spanish, French
- Type: Music software
- License: Proprietary commercial software
- Website: www.beatunes.com

beaTunes is a commercial software package for Microsoft Windows and Mac OS X, developed and distributed by tagtraum industries incorporated. The software has a free trial and costs $34.95.

== Features ==
beaTunes was originally designed as a companion app to iTunes that can detect and edit the BPM in music from iTunes. Since version 3, beaTunes is not dependent on iTunes anymore and supports harmonic mixing and Beatmixing through BPM and key detection. It can also correct and update information about music files, remove duplicates, create playlists, correct inconsistent artist names, and add key and volume balancing. It supports MP3 and AAC formats. Keys are displayed in either their musical notation or in Open Key Notation.

== Reception ==
beaTunes was given 3 out of 5 stars from Softpedia and an 8 out of 10 from MacTech.

== See also ==
- Harmonic mixing
- Beatmixing
- Music Theory
- DJing
