= Todoist =

Task management software

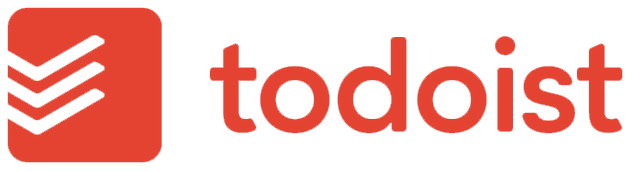
- Developer: Doist
- Platform: Web, Windows, macOS, Linux, iOS, Android, watchOS (Apple Watch), Wear OS (Google)
- Available in: 19 languages
- Type: Productivity tool
- License: Freemium
- Website: todoist.com

Todoist is a task and work management application developed by Doist. It was created in 2007 by Amir Salihefendic and is available on web, desktop, and mobile platforms. As of 2024, the application had over 30 million registered users.

== Overview ==
Todoist allows users to organize tasks using projects, labels, priority levels, due dates, and comments. Additional features include reminders, goal tracking, and calendar integration with push notification reminders based on location. Tasks can be added with voice commands and the AI can answer questions about tasks or break them down into sub-tasks. Todoist is available on tablets, desktop computers, smartphones, and wearables.

== History ==
Todoist was created in 2007 by Amir Salihefendic as a hobby project. It was developed without any formal funding. By 2012, it had 350,000 users which grew to 5 million by 2015. The web version of Todoist was introduced in 2012, along with HTML 5 integration and native mobile applications. In 2013, it added the "Karma" system, which gamified the completion of tasks by rewarding users with Karma for completing tasks on time. In 2015, the ability to interpret sentences into recurring tasks and appointments was added.

In 2016, it added "Smart Calendar," which suggests deadlines for tasks based on the user's schedule and habits. Todoist was also rebranded that year with a new logo and changes to the user interface. In 2019, Todoist Foundations was released. This release added sub-sections to projects, user interface improvements, and setup the tool for future changes. In 2020, "Workspaces" was added for teams to collaborate on projects and kanban-style "Boards" for business users. It also added "Upcoming View," which shows tasks coming up that day or week.

As of 2024, there were 30 million users. Todoist clients are available for Android, Windows, Mac, and Linux.
