= 4 Paws of Crab =

- Release: 1994
- Operating system: Macintosh, Windows

4 Paws of Crab, also known as 4 Paws of Crab:An Interactive Thai Cookbook, is a CD-ROM software from Live Oaks Multimedia.

== Summary ==
4 Paws of Crab introduces the user to Thai cuisine and culture that is part cookbook, part travelogue and part personal history. The CD-ROM includes 45 Thai recipes with how-to videos and cross-references to an ingredient glossary that includes photos.

== Development ==
4 Paws of Crab was developed by Live Oak Multimedia, a company based in Emeryville, California.

== Reception ==
CNET said "this vibrant CD gives you something you rarely get from a printed volume: an overwhelming urge to go cook something from it."

Macworld named 4 Paws of Crab as one of the year's best CD-ROM titles.
