= Scooters Union =

- Origin: Durban, KwaZulu-Natal, South Africa
- Genres: Rock
- Years active: 1990s
- Past members: Rhys Johnstone (frontman), Nux Schwartz (lead guitar), Steve du Plessis (drums), Danny Major (bass guitar) and Greg Leisegang (keyboards)

Scooters Union were a South African rock band from Durban. They released one album, Vivid Memories of Static, which was nominated for two South African Music Awards, and they also produced two hits, 'Blue Man in a Bulldozer,' and 'Brave Heart.'

The band had a turbulent beginning, playing small shows in bars, to be cut short when frontman Rhys Johnstone headed overseas. He was frustrated by their lack of progress in a culture dismissive of local music. The guitarist persuaded him to return a few years later, and the band went on to play sold-out shows. They appeared alongside such acts as the Spin Doctors, Tracy Chapman, and Crowded House. The band were described as regulars at festivals, including Splashy Fen, Oppikoppi, and The National Festival of the Arts. Their single, "Blue Man in a Bulldozer," received national airplay.

Their sound is described as a blend of rock, pop, Cajun, and African. Reviewer Kurt Shoemaker describes their album as 'a gem,' containing rock with beautiful vocal harmonies, some 'classic' country music, Avant-garde, and an instrumental accordion track.

Articles indicate the band has disbanded and at least one member has moved on to other projects.
