= Realmac Software =

British software company

- Type: Private
- Industry: Software development
- Founded: November 2002
- Founder: Dan Counsell
- Headquarters: Brighton, England
- Products: Clear, Analog, Ember, RapidWeaver, Typed, Courier
- Website: realmacsoftware.com

Realmac Software is an English independent software company based in Brighton, England. Dan Counsell founded the company in November 2002 and serves as its director.

== History ==
In November 2002, Dan Counsell founded Realmac Software. The company released RapidWeaver, a template-based website editor, in 2004. Realmac Software acquired EventBox, a social media app, from its developers, The Cosmic Machine, in October 2009. Realmac Software released Clear, a to-do list app, for iOS in January and Mac operating systems in November 2012. The app reached spot two on the Apple Mac App Store behind Apple's Mountain Lion operating system. The app was also listed on FierceDeveloper's list of "Top Apps" in February 2012. FierceDeveloper named Realmac Software a "2012 Rising Star of Mobile Development" that November.

The company released Analog, a photo manipulation software, in May 2013. The following month, Realmac Software released Ember, an app designed to capture and organize screenshots. The company announced the release of Typed, an OS X app for writing in Markdown, in July 2014. That October, Clear was ranked 12th on Business Insider's list of "The World’s Greatest Apps."

== Apps ==
- Clear
- Analog
- Ember
- RapidWeaver
- Courier
- Squash
