= MovieWorks =

- Developer: Interactive Solutions
- Release: March 1992
- Operating system: Windows; Macintosh

MovieWorks (later known as MovieWorks Interactive and MovieWorks Deluxe) is a multimedia authoring system from Interactive Solutions. It allows the user to create multimedia presentations with analog or digital video, photos, graphics, animations, 3-D, narration, MIDI, MP3, CD music, text and titling, and virtual reality movies. The software was tightly coupled with Apple's QuickTime multimedia architecture.

== Development ==
MovieWorks was developed by Interactive Solutions, a company founded in 1987. Development on MovieWorks started in March 1991; the first version was slated for a March 1992 release.

== Versions ==
- MovieWorks 1.0
- MovieWorks Interactive 1.0 (1993)
- MovieWorks Deluxe 5.0 (2001)

== Reception ==
MacHome Journal praised the additions to MovieWorks Interactive with version 4.0, deeming it "instantly usable, completely intuitive and amazingly powerful", albeit with limitations to the degree of interactivity due to its linear timeline. MacAddict liked the overall package of MovieWorks Interactive. Mac Today called MovieWorks Interactive a bargain given both its asking price and rich feature set compared to its contemporaries.

== See also ==
- Macromedia Director
