= Braveheartbattle =

German running event

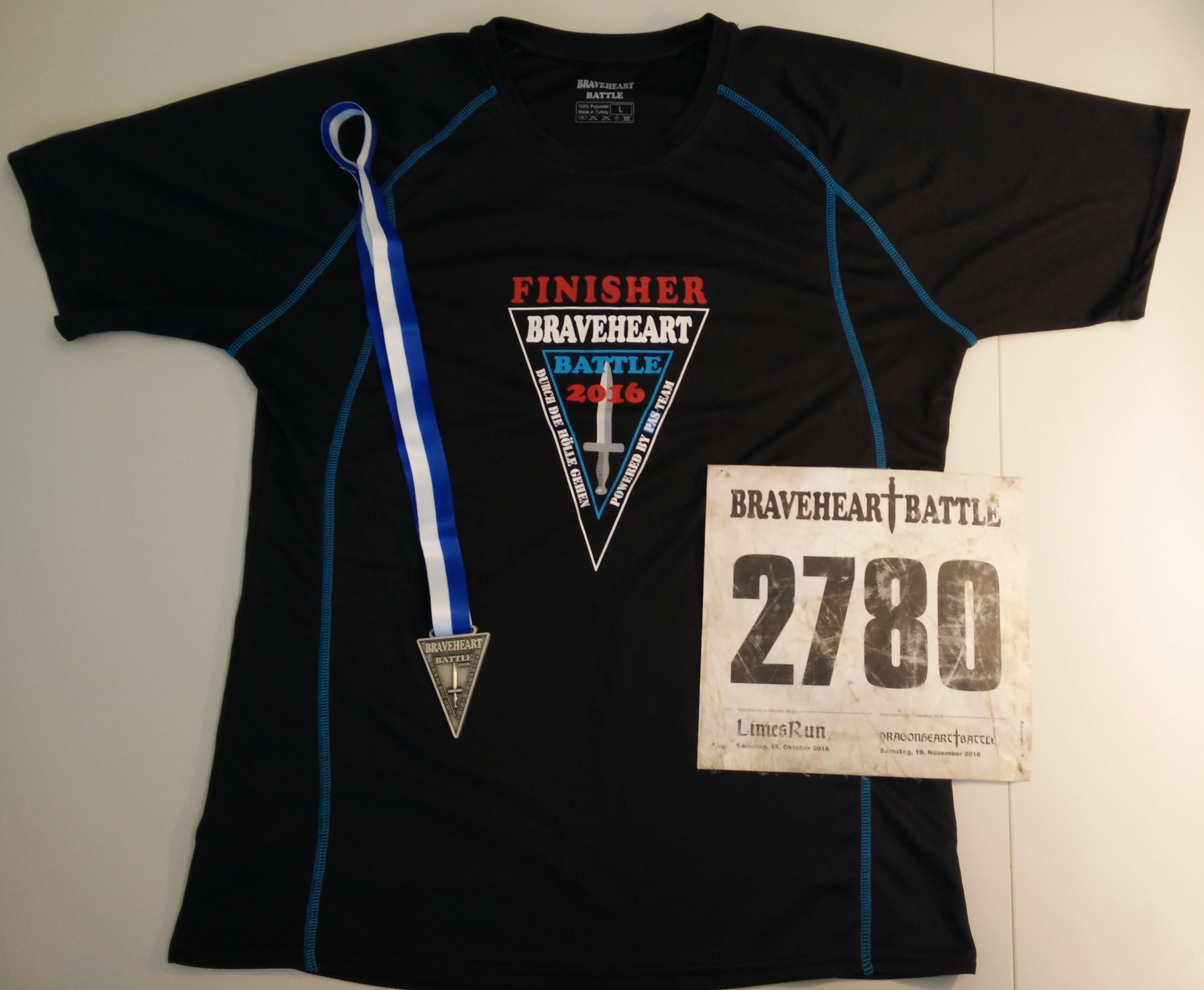
Braveheart Battle 2016 starter number, finisher T-shirt and medal.

The BraveheartBattle (official German name BraveheartBattle - Extrem Lauf - Das Laufevent in Deutschland) is a running event in Germany held annually from 2010. It takes place in March, the first six years in Münnerstadt while on 12. In march 2016 it was held in Bischofsheim an der Rhön. The race takes the up to 3000 participants through an about 30 km cross-country route with about fifty natural or artificial obstacles. Some obstacles have "drill instructors" pacing the participants, others are meant to be passed with the participants helping each other. With the obstacles involving frigid water, snow, mud, fire and electricity the event is described as an extreme sport.
