= Algebra Smart =

Software CD-ROM

- Developer: The Princeton Review
- Release: 1996
- Operating system: Windows; Macintosh

Algebra Smart is a software CD-ROM from The Princeton Review. It is for ages 14 and up.

== Summary ==
Algebra Smart consists of 12 lessons which use video clips of teen-friendly instructors. In Algebra Smart you can track your progress of your lessons.

== Development ==
Algebra Smart was developed by The Princeton Review, a company founded in 1981.

== Reception ==
MacHome Journal called Algebra Smart helpful in helping struggling algebra students in a fun and affordable way.
