= Yummy FTP =

- Developer: Yummy Software
- Stable release: 2.0.5 / March 17, 2018; 8 years ago
- Operating system: Mac OS, Mac OS X (Universal)
- Available in: 12 languages
- List of languages English, German, French, Dutch, Italian, Japanese, Norwegian, Traditional Chinese, Simplified Chinese, Russian, Portuguese, Spanish
- Type: FTP client
- License: Proprietary, Setapp
- Website: www.yummysoftware.com

Yummy FTP Pro is an FTP client for macOS made by Yummy Software. It supports FTP/S, SFTP and WebDAV/S. It is noted for its speed and reliability, and automation capability using AppleScript.

Its programmer died in August 2018 and there seems to be no one continuing his work. As the program is 32-bit, it will fail to work starting with macOS 10.15 Catalina.
