= Music MiniPlayer =

Music player application

- Developer: Mario Guzman
- Release: 2022
- Written in: Swift
- Operating system: macOS
- Platform: Intel, Apple Silicon
- Available in: 6 languages
- List of languages English, Spanish, Italian, Finnish, German, Polish
- Type: Media player software
- License: Closed source
- Website: https://marioaguzman.github.io/musicminiplayer/

Music MiniPlayer is a free, closed source music player application that offers a different miniplayer that can be used with the Apple Music desktop application. It aims to recreate the miniplayer seen on iTunes 10. It is available for macOS Monterey or above.

== Features ==
Music MiniPlayer is not a music player itself, but instead interfaces with Apple Music, the music app that is built into macOS. The software is designed to recreate the Aqua user interface seen on iTunes 10. It also includes support for playlists, which the original miniplayer in iTunes 10 did not. The application includes the regular music player controls as well as a snap back button to return to Apple Music and support for Apple Music 1 radio shows. Music MiniPlayer supports shuffle and repeat play modes. It can also float over other windows.

Music MiniPlayer was written in Swift using the AppKit, Core Graphics, and Core Animations frameworks. It requires macOS Monterey or above and supports Intel and Apple Silicon Macs.

== Reception ==
Music MiniPlayer was one of the MacLife Editor's Choices in the October 2022 issue, stating "great fun and a lovely piece of nostalgia that's also genuinely useful." The application was praised for its nostalgia factor and features, but it was noted that Apple Music comes with its own built in miniplayer and that other software exists.

== See also ==
- Comparison of audio player software
