= AMA Family Medical Guide =

- Developer: DK Multimedia
- Release: 1995
- Operating system: Macintosh, Windows

AMA Family Medical Guide, also known as The American Medical Association Family Medical Guide, is a software CD-ROM from DK Multimedia. A Macintosh version was released in Spring 1996.

== Summary ==
AMA Family Medical Guide consists of medical illustrations from medical books in addition to audio with questions that need answering.

== Reception ==
Evansville Courier and Press liked the presentation in AMA Family Medical Guide.

AMA Family Medical Guide ranked 9th on PC Data's list of the 10 best-selling family health and medical CD-ROMs in the U.S. for the first six months of 1997.

AMA Family Medical Guide was named one of the top 100 CD-ROMs by PC Magazine.
