= DeLorme =

Personal satellite tracking and navigation technology company

DeLorme Publishing Company

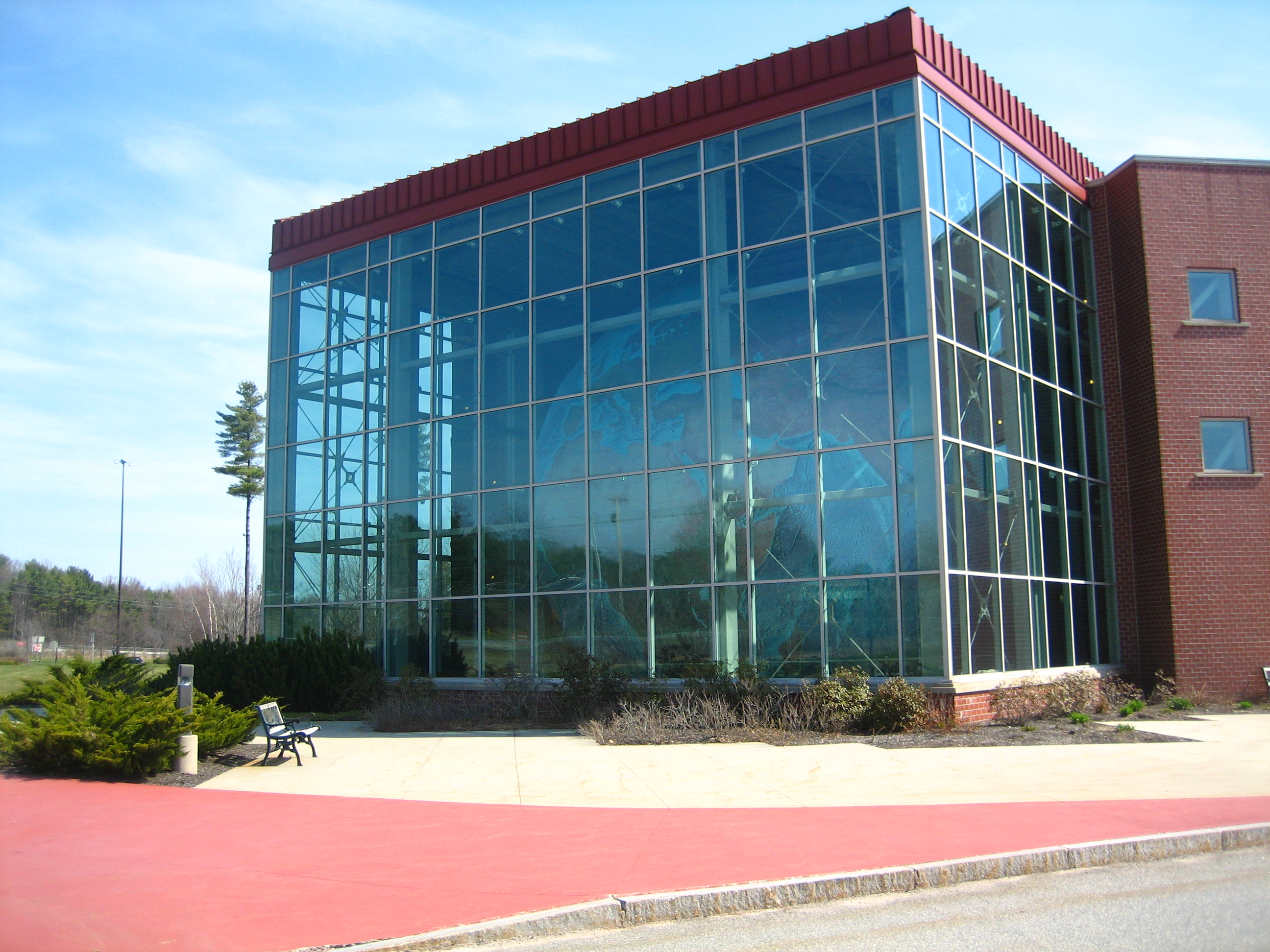
- Headquarters in Yarmouth, Maine, pictured in 2012
- Industry: Software; Technology
- Founded: 1976
- Founder: David DeLorme
- Fate: Acquired by Garmin (2016), operations to continue
- Headquarters: Yarmouth, Maine, United States
- Products: inReach
- Services: Personal satellite tracking Messaging; Navigation technology
- Parent: Garmin (2016–present)
- Website: delorme.com

DeLorme Publishing Company was a producer of personal satellite tracking, messaging, and navigation technology. On February 11, 2016, the company announced that it had been purchased by Garmin, another multinational producer of GPS products and services.

DeLorme was founded in 1976, and was headquartered in Yarmouth, Maine. The headquarters are now a Garmin office. Within its headquarters is Eartha, which holds the world record for the largest revolving globe.

== Products ==
The company's main product, inReach, integrates GPS and satellite technologies. inReach provides the ability to send and receive text messages to and from anywhere in the world (including when beyond cell phone range) by using the Iridium satellite constellation. By pairing with a smartphone, navigation is possible with access to free downloadable topographic maps and National Oceanic and Atmospheric Administration (NOAA) charts. Garmin continues to develop inReach products, however they no longer use DeLorme branding.

DeLorme also produces printed atlases and topographic software products. The company uses a combination of digital technologies and human editors to verify travel information and map details. DeLorme Atlas & Gazetteer is an extension for vehicular GPS or online mapping sites, allowing a traveler to browse and highlight the desired route and the possible activities or excursions along the way or at the destination. DeLorme's Topo software is one of the sources of North American trail, logging road, and terrain data for outdoor enthusiasts. Topo 10 has US and Canada topographic maps and elevation data with more than four million places of interest. Topo includes comprehensive park, lake, river and stream data for all 50 states. Garmin continues to sell paper atlases with DeLorme branding, with more than 20 million copies sold to date.

== History ==
The company was founded in 1976 by David DeLorme, who, being frustrated with obsolete back-country maps of the Moosehead Lake region of Maine, vowed to create a better map of Maine.

DeLorme combined state highway, county, and town maps as well as federal surveys to produce the Maine Atlas and Gazetteer which was printed in a large-format book with an initial printing of 10,000, which he marketed out of his car. The Gazetteer, which listed bicycle trails, canoeing and kayaking trips, and museum and historic sites, proved quite successful.

The company expanded to 75 employees in 1986, working from a Quonset hut in Freeport, Maine, producing maps for New England and upstate New York.

In 1987, the company produced a CD with detailed topographic map data of the entire world.

In 1991, DeLorme began vending Street Atlas USA on a single CD-ROM, becoming the most popular street-map CD in the United States, as well as one of the first mass consumer CD-ROM software products of any kind.

By 1995, DeLorme had 44 percent of the market share for CD maps. The same year the company partnered with the American Automobile Association (AAA) to produce the AAA Map 'n' Go, the first mapping product to generate automatic routing. They also introduced the DeLorme GPS receiver to work with its maps.

In 1996, it introduced its maps into the PDA environment via Palm.

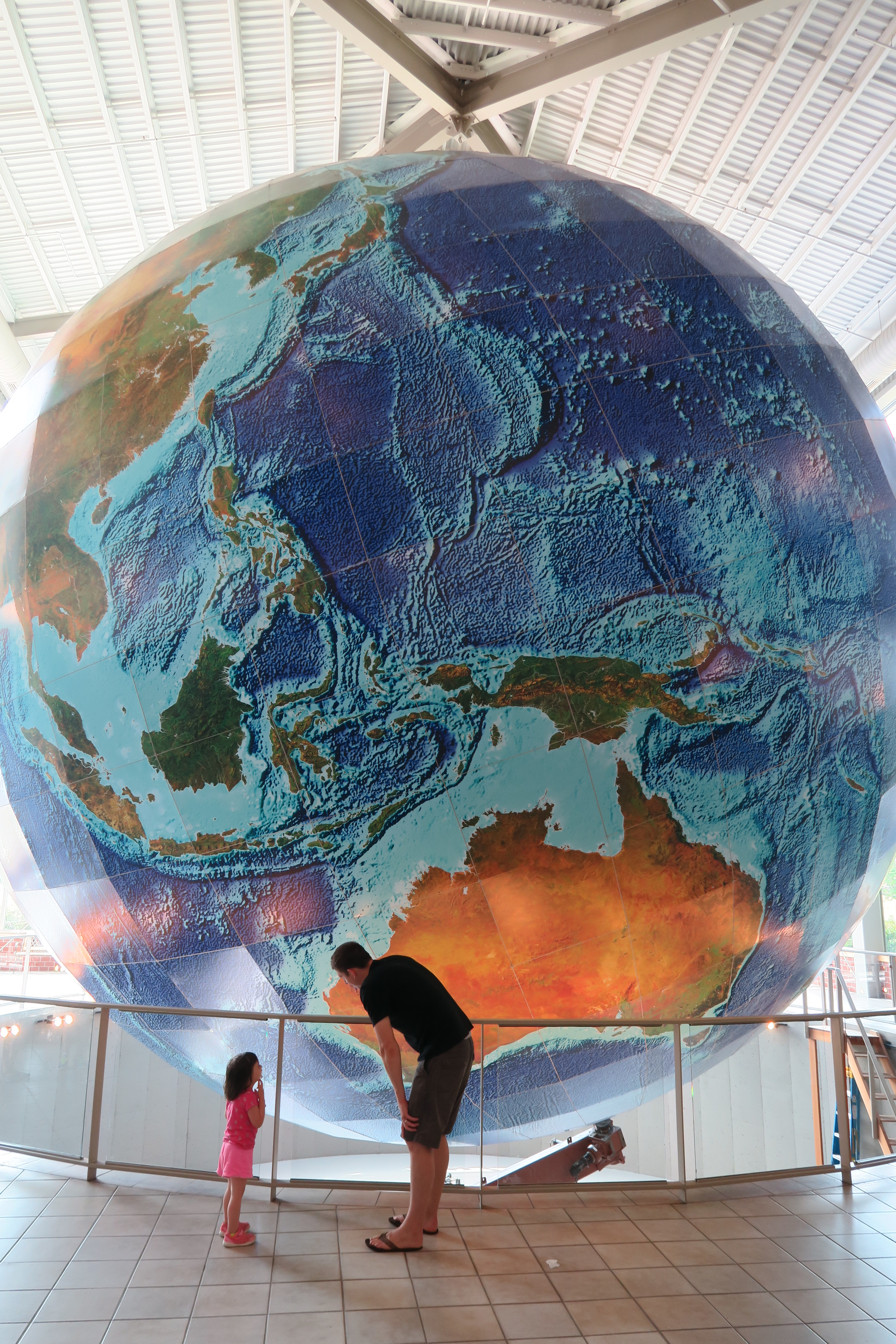
Eartha, the world's largest rotating and revolving globe, within the former headquarters of DeLorme in Yarmouth, Maine

In 1997, the company relocated to a corporate campus in Yarmouth, Maine, which includes Eartha, a large rotating globe. The facility has hosted geographic educational sessions for schoolchildren, and Eartha can be viewed by visitors from the building's three-story balconies.

In 1999, DeLorme introduced 3D TopoQuad DVD and CD products, which include digitized U.S. topographic maps.

In 2001, XMap professional GIS map program was produced on CD, and an expanded XMap was released in 2002, modified to provide GPS functionality to Palm OS and Pocket PC.

In 2004, DeLorme became the first company to sell a USB GPS device, the Earthmate GPS LT-20. At the same time, it began offering downloadable satellite and USGS 7.5-minute quads that could be overlaid on its maps using a new NetLink feature. Earlier models of Earthmate were among the first GPS receivers tethered to laptops.

In 2006/2007, the firm introduced its first full-featured GPS standalone receiver, the Earthmate GPS PN-20. During 2008, the company continued expanding its handheld GPS line with the Earthmate GPS PN-40 model. DeLorme also began selling OEM GPS modules allowing other manufacturers to add GPS to their products. In addition, the company began selling data to businesses.

In 2009, DeLorme released D.A.E. (Digital Atlas of the Earth). It is the first worldwide GPS accurate topographical map with a scale of 1 to 50,000. D.A.E. is the official world map for the US and Australian militaries. It is a virtual globe of the earth that is almost 1,000 feet in diameter.

=== Acquisition ===
On February 11, 2016, GPS products and services company Garmin announced it had agreed to purchase DeLorme. The announcement stated operations at DeLorme's Yarmouth facility would continue. Another announcement (March 3, 2016) confirmed the acquisition was complete.

== See also ==
- Maps of the United States
- Geospatial
- Trail maps
