= ChitChat =

Instant messaging client for Mac OS X

- Developer(s): Tomis Erwin
- Stable release: 1.2.2 / October 19, 2005
- Operating system: Mac OS X
- Type: Instant messaging client
- License: Donationware
- Website: ChitChat Homepage

ChitChat was an open-source instant messaging client for Mac OS X supporting the Yahoo! Messenger protocol. It enabled users to chat with each other over the global Yahoo! chat system. The last version, ChitChat 1.2, had a more refined user interface, speed improvements, Address Book support, IM reformatting, an improved events system, and numerous bug fixes. ChitChat was programmed in the REALBasic programming environment.

== History ==
ChitChat was an offshoot of "miChat!", a Yahoo! Chat program for Macintosh computers written by J. Seth Lowe in the REALbasic programming language. In late 2000, Seth publicly asked for other REALbasic programmers to join the project, in the hope that it would spawn a number of competing Yahoo! Chat clients and enrich the Macintosh experience. A programmer by the name of Tomis Erwin responded to this query. After collaborating on several features, Seth encouraged him to take free rein in creating his own client from the miChat code base.

The new program, dubbed "ChitChat", went through several major interface overhauls throughout its existence, seemingly in perpetual beta or pre-release, though it was available publicly. Finally, "ChitChat 1.0" was released in early 2004 with versions for Mac OS 9, Mac OS X, and Windows 98.

Over the years ChitChat had picked up a rather large feature set. In an effort to deflect feature creep without crippling the program, "ChitChat Lite" was introduced in late 2005. The Lite version, a simplified no-frills release, never picked up as large a user base as its predecessor.

== End of the Line ==
In April 2006, Yahoo! disconnected their "Java Chat" (known internally as YCHT protocol) in favor of the newer Yahoo! Messenger protocol (known as YMSG). ChitChat was designed on this older protocol and would need to be rewritten to support the new system. Citing the amount of time and effort a re-write would entail, Tomis announced that ChitChat was effectively terminated.

"...I would like to thank everyone for all the support over the years. It was fun, and I learned a lot..." ~ Tomis Erwin, ChitChat Homepage

During the years that ChitChat was in active development, a new trend in chat clients emerged; that of the multi-client. Multi-Clients connect to more than one service at once, this reduces the number of programs a user must simultaneously run on their computer. The only multi-client that can connect to Yahoo! Chat (as opposed to regular Instant Messaging) as of this writing is Adium
