= OnyX =

Freeware utility for maintenance and optimization of macOS

- OnyX running on macOS Sierra
- Developers: Joël Barrière; Titanium Software
- Stable release: 5.1.1 / 11 October 2026; 17 days ago
- Operating system: macOS
- Available in: Multilingual
- Type: Utilities, Maintenance, Optimization
- License: Freeware
- Website: Titanium Software

OnyX is a popular freeware utility for macOS developed by French developer Joël Barrière that is compatible with both Intel processors and Apple silicon (previous versions supported PowerPC). As a multifunctional tool for maintenance and optimization, it can control many basic Unix programs already built into macOS, including setting hidden preferences otherwise modified by using property list editors and the command line.

== Features ==
- Verify the structure of the file system on the start-up volume
- Repair disk permissions
- Configure certain parameters hidden from the system and from certain applications
- Empty System, User, Internet, Font caches
- Force Empty the Trash
- Rebuild Launch Services, CoreDuet database, XPC Cache...
- Rebuild Spotlight and Mail indexes

== Development ==
Created in 2003 by Joël Barrière, a.k.a. Titanium, the program was originally meant to address its creator's personal needs. Developed using Xcode, Apple's software development environment (Cocoa + AppleScript Studio + Objective-C), OnyX is regularly updated by its author taking into consideration users' suggestions and requests. To do its job, the program uses macOS's standard Unix utilities, allowing their control through a graphical user interface without needing the command line.

== Versions ==
OnyX versions are specific to each version of macOS and are not backward compatible. The program will not work correctly if used with an OS for which it was not designed.

- Mac OS X 10.2 Jaguar: OnyX version 1.3.1
- Mac OS X 10.3 Panther: OnyX version 1.5.3
- Mac OS X 10.4 Tiger: OnyX version 1.8.6
- Mac OS X 10.5 Leopard: OnyX version 2.0.6
- Mac OS X 10.6 Snow Leopard: OnyX version 2.4.0
- Mac OS X 10.7 Lion: OnyX version 2.4.8
- OS X 10.8 Mountain Lion: OnyX version 2.7.4
- OS X 10.9 Mavericks: OnyX version 2.8.9
- OS X 10.10 Yosemite: OnyX version 3.0.2
- OS X 10.11 El Capitan: OnyX version 3.1.9
- macOS 10.12 Sierra: OnyX version 3.3.1
- macOS 10.13 High Sierra: OnyX version 3.4.9
- macOS 10.14 Mojave: OnyX version 3.6.8
- macOS 10.15 Catalina: OnyX version 3.8.7
- macOS 11 Big Sur: OnyX version 4.0.2
- macOS 12 Monterey: OnyX version 4.2.7
- macOS 13 Ventura: OnyX version 4.4.7
- macOS 14 Sonoma: OnyX version 4.6.2
- macOS 15 Sequoia: OnyX version 4.7.5
- macOS 26 Tahoe: OnyX version 5.0.2
- macOS 27 Golden Gate: OnyX version 5.1.1

The build for macOS Golden Gate is actively maintained. However, all previous versions in support of past operating systems are still available for download from the developer's website.

== See also ==
- TinkerTool
