= Montage (screenwriting software) =

Screenwriting software

- Developer: Mariner software
- Stable release: 1.5.4 / October 2009
- Operating system: Mac OS X
- Type: Screenwriting software
- License: Proprietary
- Website: www.marinersoftware.com/products/montage/

Montage is screenwriting software developed for Mac OS X. It allows the creation, editing, and management of screenplays on Macintosh computers. Montage can import Final Draft documents and text- and RTF-formatted files. It includes custom, pre-formatted templates for film, TV, and theater.

== See also ==
- Screenplay
- Screenwriting
