= Braveheart (software) =

- Developer: Midisoft Corporation
- Release: 1995
- Operating system: Windows

Braveheart is a software CD-ROM from Midisoft Corporation. Braveheart was developed in cooperation with Viacom Consumer Products, Paramount Pictures and Icon Productions. It is based on the film Braveheart.

== Summary ==
Braveheart was narrated by Paul Whitworth, an actor and director who is on the UC Santa Cruz theater arts faculty. It contains video, photos, and music from the film.

== Development ==
Braveheart was developed by Midisoft Corporation, a company founded in 1986.

== Reception ==
CNET recommended Braveheart to people who enjoyed the film.
