= Paintbrush (software) =

Raster graphics editor for Mac OS X

- Developer: Soggy Waffles
- Written in: Objective-C
- Operating system: Mac OS X
- Available in: English
- Type: Raster graphics editor
- License: BSD licenses
- Website: paintbrush.sourceforge.net

Paintbrush is a raster graphics editor for Mac OS X. It initially aimed to replace MacPaint, an image editor for the classic Mac OS last released in 1988. It also is an alternative to Microsoft Paint. It has basic raster image editing capabilities and a simple interface designed for ease of use. It exports as PNG, JPG, BMP, GIF, and TIFF. The application also is often used for pixel art because of its grid option, and isn't intended for advanced photo manipulation features found in applications such as GIMP or Photoshop.

== Features and capabilities ==
Paintbrush is distributed as free and open source software under BSD-style licensing. It includes features like drawing, erasing, spray, fill, line, shape, text, color, and zoom. Zoom can scale from 25% to 1600%. Adjustable stroke sizes can be used with brush, eraser, and spray. Stroke size 1 has a width of 1 pixel, and stroke size 10 has a width of 19 pixels. The text tool allows users to select from their computer's font menu.

Paintbrush also includes a grid capability which shows each individual pixel on a grid. This option is often used by pixel artists.

The application includes an invert colors option, and a crop-selected-area function.

Like Microsoft Paint, it can export all of the universal image formats such as PNG, JPEG, BMP, GIF, or TIFF.

== Limitations ==
The application is purely a 2D bitmap editor, and as such has no vector capabilities. It is also not designed for photo manipulation, and therefore lacks advanced photo editing tools such as saturation, exposure, sharpness, or tint.

It also has a limitation in that the brush, spray can, and eraser will not draw any colors with opacity or transparency.

== See also ==
- Comparison of raster graphics editors
- GIMP
- Pixelmator
- Seashore
