= Marketing of Apple Inc. =

The marketing of Apple Inc. encompasses the company's advertising, distribution, and branding. After Steve Jobs returned to Apple in 1997, he made industrial design a key element of the company's branding strategy. Apple's public image has been shaped by several acclaimed advertisements made in partnership with TBWA\Chiat\Day, including "1984" and "Get a Mac". Many of Apple's product announcements occur during keynote speeches the company gives several times a year, at Apple Special Events or at Apple's Worldwide Developers Conference, that help reinforce Apple's brand.

== Advertising ==
- 1984 (advertisement)
- Think different
- Switch (advertising campaign)
- Get a Mac

== Brand partnerships ==
- Nike+iPod
- Apple Watch and Hermès

== Branding ==
According to Steve Jobs, the company's name was inspired by his visit to an apple farm while he was on a fruitarian diet. He thought the name "Apple" was "fun, spirited, and not intimidating". Steve Jobs and Steve Wozniak were fans of the Beatles, but Apple Inc. had name and logo trademark issues with Apple Corps Ltd., a multimedia company started by the Beatles in 1968. This resulted in a series of lawsuits and tension between the two companies. These issues were resolved when the companies settled their lawsuit in 2007.

=== Logo ===
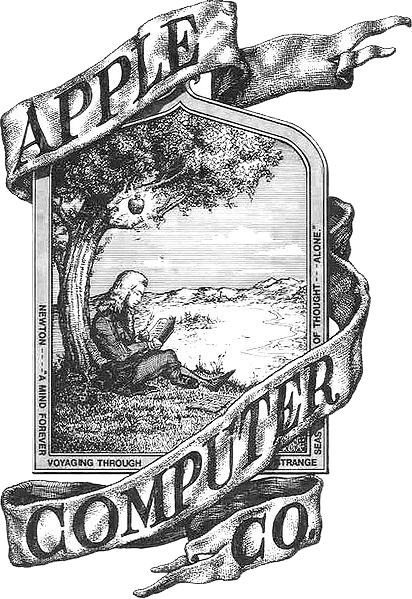
First Apple logo
(1976–1977)

First official logo
(1977–1999)

Current logo
(since 1999)

Apple's first logo, designed by co-founder Ron Wayne, was a complex, hand-drawn design depicting Sir Isaac Newton sitting under an apple tree inside a picture frame, with a ribbon-banner reading "APPLE COMPUTER CO." ornamenting it.

It was almost immediately replaced by Rob Janoff's "rainbow Apple", the more simplistic now-familiar design of an apple with a bite taken out of it, painted in the colors of the rainbow with the order rearranged so that the leaf on top was green. Janoff, who worked for Apple’s marketing consultant Regis McKenna, presented Jobs with several different monochromatic themes for the "bitten" logo, and Jobs immediately took a liking to it. However, Jobs insisted that the logo be colorized to humanize the company. The logo was designed with a bite so that it would not be confused with a cherry. The colored stripes were conceived to make the logo more accessible, and to represent the Apple II's color graphics; McKenna credits them to Tom Kamifuji, “an artist who did kabuki figures in multiple colors all through that psychedelic age in the ’60s”. This logo has been erroneously referred to as a tribute to Alan Turing, with the bite mark a reference to his method of suicide. Both Janoff and Apple deny any homage to Turing in the design of the logo.

On August 27, 1999 (the year following the introduction of the iMac G3), Apple officially dropped the rainbow scheme and began to use single-color logos nearly identical in shape to the previous rainbow incarnation. However, different color variants appeared on some 1998 Apple devices, one year before the single-color scheme was finalized. An Aqua-themed version of the logo was used from 1997 until 2003, and a glass-themed version was used from 2007 until 2013.

=== Brand loyalty ===
The scenes I witnessed at the opening of the new Apple store in London's Covent Garden were more like an evangelical prayer meeting than a chance to buy a phone or a laptop.

— Alex Riley, writing for the BBC

Apple customers gained a reputation for devotion and loyalty early in the company's history. In 1984, BYTE stated that:

There are two kinds of people in the world: people who say Apple isn't just a company, it's a cause; and people who say Apple isn't a cause, it's just a company. Both groups are right. Nature has suspended the principle of noncontradiction where Apple is concerned. Apple is more than just a company because its founding has some of the qualities of myth ... Apple is two guys in a garage undertaking the mission of bringing computing power, once reserved for big corporations, to ordinary individuals with ordinary budgets. The company's growth from two guys to a billion-dollar corporation exemplifies the American Dream. Even as a large corporation, Apple plays David to IBM's Goliath, and thus has the sympathetic role in that myth.

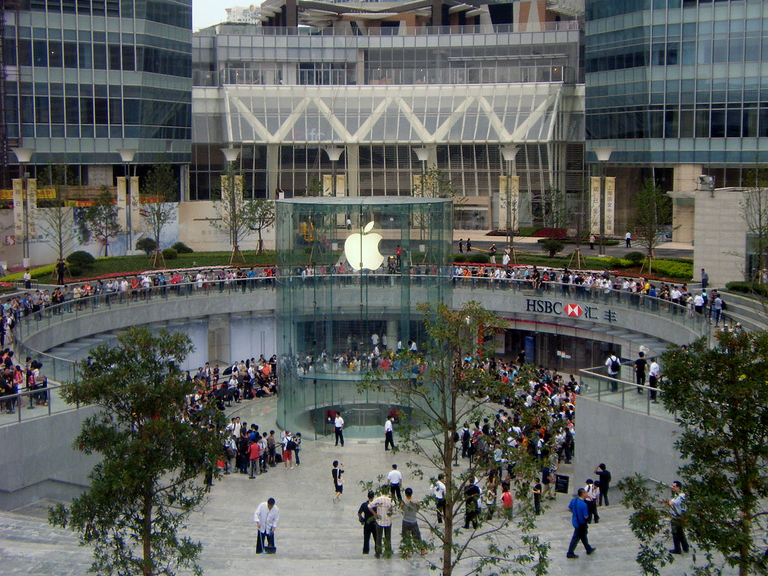
Apple customers wait in line around an Apple Store in Shanghai in anticipation of a new product.

Apple evangelists were actively engaged by the company at one time, but this was after the phenomenon had already been firmly established. Apple evangelist Guy Kawasaki has called the brand fanaticism "something that was stumbled upon", and Ive explained in 2014 that "People have an incredibly personal relationship" with Apple's products. Apple Store openings and new product releases can draw crowds of hundreds, and some wait in line as much as a day before the opening. The opening of New York City's Apple Fifth Avenue store in 2006 was highly attended, and had visitors from Europe who flew in for the event. In June 2017, a newlywed couple shot wedding photos inside the recently opened Orchard Road Apple Store in Singapore. The high level of brand loyalty has been criticized and ridiculed, applying the epithet "Apple fanboy" and mocking the lengthy lines before a product launch. An internal memo leaked in 2015 suggested the company planned to discourage long lines and direct customers to purchase its products on its website.

Fortune magazine named Apple the most admired company in the United States in 2008, and in the world from 2008 to 2012. On September 30, 2013, Apple surpassed Coca-Cola to become the world's most valuable brand in the Omnicom Group's "Best Global Brands" report. Boston Consulting Group has ranked Apple as the world's most innovative brand every year since 2005.

The New York Times in 1985 stated that "Apple above all else is a marketing company". John Sculley agreed, telling The Guardian newspaper in 1997 that "People talk about technology, but Apple was a marketing company. It was the marketing company of the decade." Research in 2002 by NetRatings indicate that the average Apple consumer was usually more affluent and better educated than other PC company consumers. The research indicated that this correlation could stem from the fact that on average Apple products were more expensive than other PC products.

In response to a query about the devotion of loyal Apple consumers, Jonathan Ive said:

What people are responding to is much bigger than the object. They are responding to something rare—a group of people who do more than simply make something work, they make the very best products they possibly can. It's a demonstration against thoughtlessness and carelessness.

== Distribution ==
=== Apple Stores ===
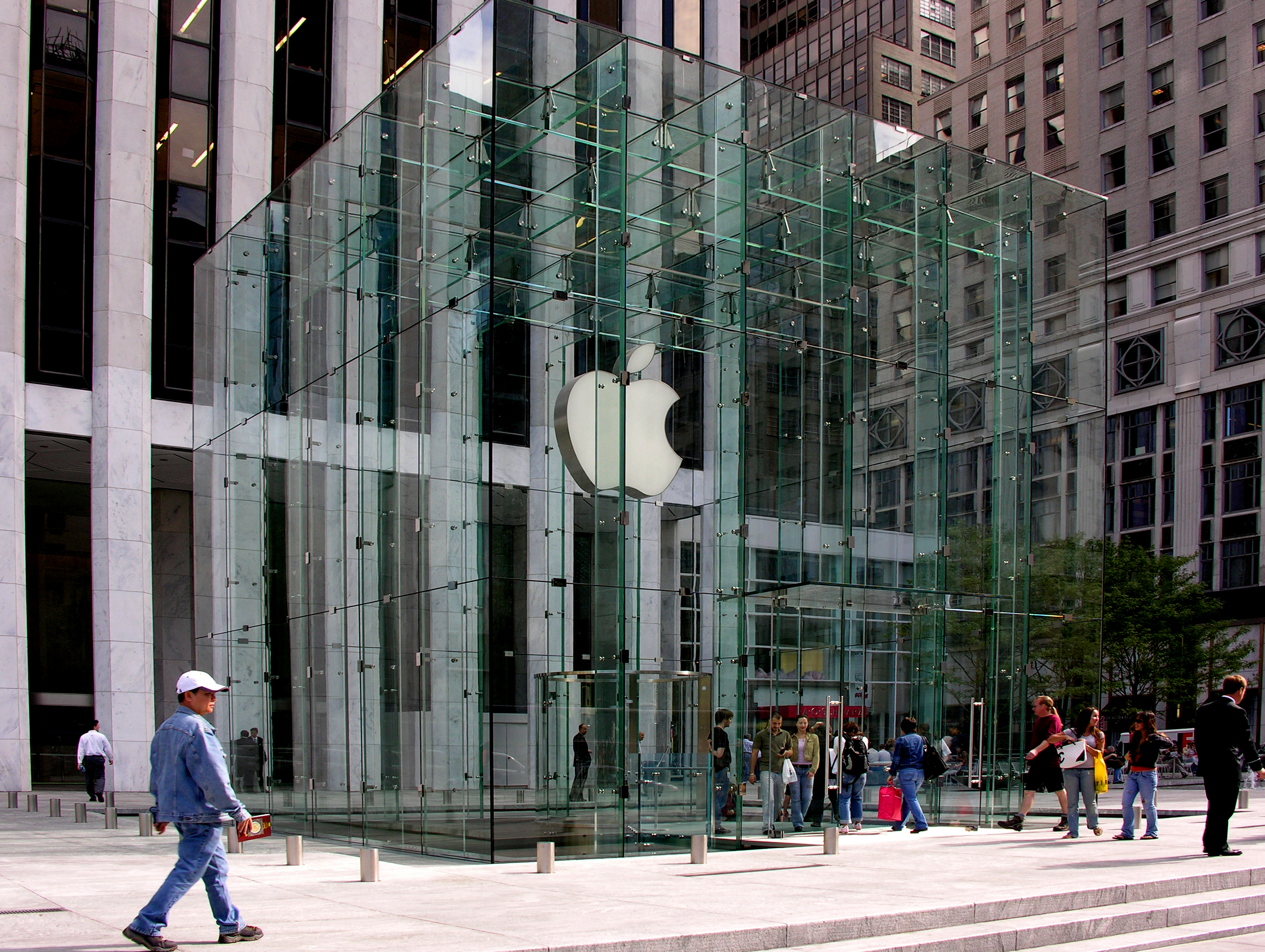
Apple Fifth Avenue is the flagship store in New York City.

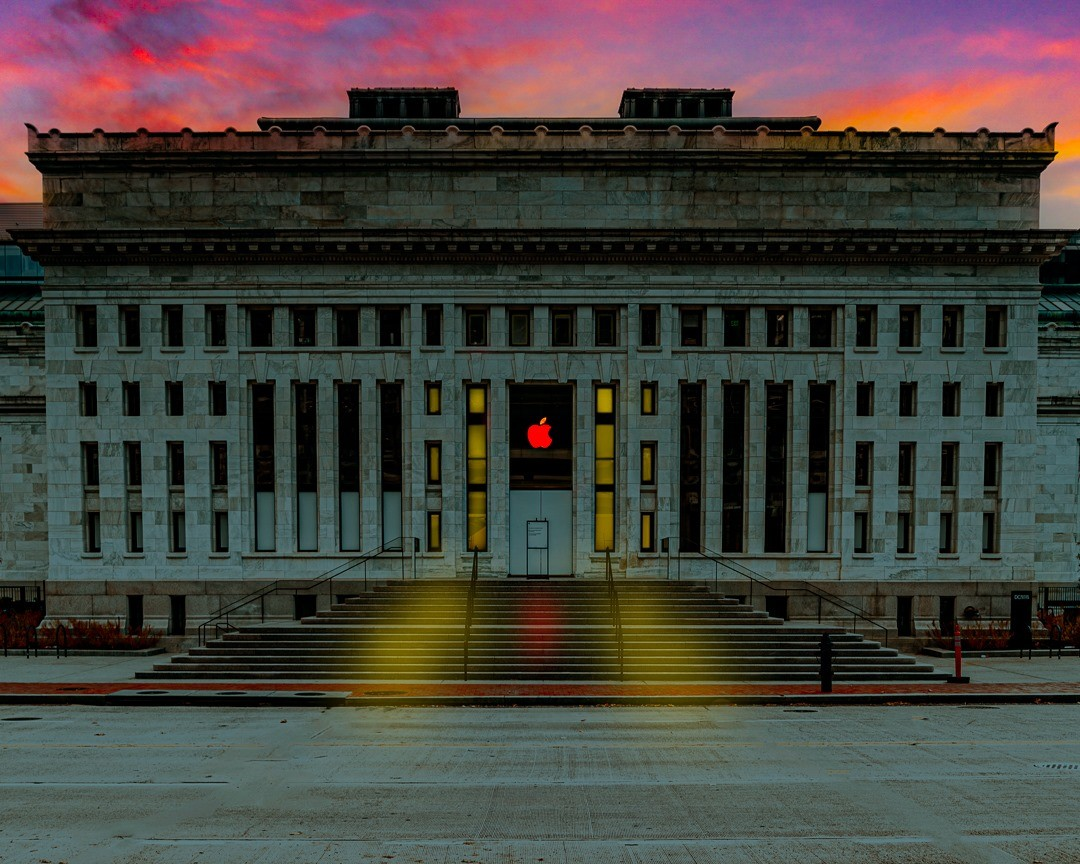
The Apple store in the Carnegie Library of Washington D.C. maintains the building's historic exterior design.

Apple opened its first two Apple Stores on May 19, 2001, in McLean, Virginia and Glendale, California, later expanding to hundreds of other locations. These stores were created on the initiative of then-CEO Steve Jobs to provide a venue for consumers to become more familiar with Apple products and the internet. In addition to standard retail, Apple Stores provide technical assistance through Genius Bars and give demonstrations to showcase Apple products. The creation of Apple Stores came after years of attempting but failing store-within-a-store concepts. Seeing a need for improved retail presentation of the company's products, Jobs began an effort in 1997 to revamp the retail program to get an improved relationship to consumers, and hired Ron Johnson in 2000. The media initially speculated that Apple would fail, but its stores were highly successful, bypassing the sales numbers of competing nearby stores and within three years reached US$1 billion in annual sales, becoming the fastest retailer in history to do so. Over the years, Apple has expanded the number of retail locations and its geographical coverage, with 499 stores across 22 countries worldwide as of December 2017. Strong product sales have placed Apple among the top-tier retail stores, with sales over $16 billion globally in 2011.

In May 2016, Angela Ahrendts, Apple's then Senior Vice President of Retail, unveiled a significantly redesigned Apple Store in Union Square, San Francisco, featuring large glass doors for the entry, open spaces, and re-branded rooms. In addition to purchasing products, consumers can get advice and help from "Creative Pros" – individuals with specialized knowledge of creative arts; get product support in a tree-lined Genius Grove; and attend sessions, conferences and community events, with Ahrendts commenting that the goal is to make Apple Stores into "town squares", a place where people naturally meet up and spend time. The new design will be applied to all Apple Stores worldwide, a process that has seen stores temporarily relocate or close.

Many Apple Stores are located inside shopping malls, but Apple has built several stand-alone "flagship" stores in high-profile locations. It has been granted design patents and received architectural awards for its stores' designs and construction, specifically for its use of glass staircases and cubes. The success of Apple Stores have had significant influence over other consumer electronics retailers, who have lost traffic, control and profits due to a perceived higher quality of service and products at Apple Stores. Apple's brand loyalty among consumers causes long lines of hundreds of people at new Apple Store openings or product releases. Due to the popularity of the brand, Apple receives many job applications, and many from young workers. Although Apple Store employees receive above-average pay, are offered money toward education and health care, and receive product discounts, there are limited paths of career advancement.

=== Website ===
Apple opened its virtual store on November 10, 1997, as the first retail distribution platform operated by Apple. Previously, Apple products were primarily sold by chain stores, which were sometimes unwilling to sell Macs due to a relatively low commission. When the virtual Apple store was launched, it became a major competitor to Dell, which was already operating a successful virtual store. In its first 30 days of operation, the virtual Apple store earned a revenue of $12 million. When launching new products, Apple has closed its virtual store in the hours before a release to create hype.

Apple expanded its role in virtual retail with the release of the iTunes Store to facilitate the purchase of music for Apple products on April 28, 2003.

== Market positioning ==
=== App Store app review ===
==== Adobe Flash ====
With the release of iOS 4.0 SDK, Apple controversially (back then) changed its developer agreement to prohibit programs that are originally written in non-Apple approved languages from being used on the iPhone. This was criticized for being anti-competitive by disallowing use of Adobe Animate (formerly Adobe Flash Professional) and other IDEs for creating iPhone apps. The New York Times quoted an Adobe employee alleging the policy to be anti-competitive. On May 3, 2010, Ars Technica and the New York Post reported that the US Federal Trade Commission (FTC) and the United States Department of Justice (DOJ) are deciding which agency will launch an antitrust investigation into the matter. Steve Jobs posted a reaction entitled "Thoughts on Flash", but did not directly address any third party development tools other than Adobe's Flash platform.

==== Copyright infringement ====
In 2012, multiple groups of Chinese writers were awarded compensation of over $200,000 from Apple for hosting apps that contained unlicensed versions of their books, according to Chinese state media.

==== Google Voice ====
Apple has been criticized over attempting to prevent iPhone users from using the Google Voice application by disabling it on the iPhone. Apple declined to approve the Google application for use on the iPhone, claiming that the application altered iPhone intended functionality, such as, that with Google voice installation, voicemail is no longer routed to the iPhone's native application Visual Voicemail but instead through Google's application, thus "ruining" the iPhone user experience. This caused controversy among iPhone developers and users, and the United States Federal Communications Commission (FCC) began investigating Apple's active decision to deny users' ability to install Google Voice from the Apple online store which is the only official way for users to download and install iPhone applications. As of November 2010, Google Voice has been made available for the iPhone.

==== Takedown of competitors' apps ====
In November 2015, f.lux, a popular computer program for adjusting a display's colors during night-time to remove blue-light that may affect sleep patterns, was made available for iOS devices through "sideloading"; users install Xcode, a development environment for Mac computers, and manually install the app on their iOS device, bypassing the App Store and the official release channels that do not grant required permissions for f.lux to work. One day later, the developers of f.lux made the sideloading app unavailable, having been contacted by Apple with information that such a procedure violates the Developer Program Agreement. In March 2016, an update to the iOS operating system enabled Apple's own "Night Shift" implementation, and the "Night Shift" feature was later expanded to the macOS operating system in March 2017. After the iOS availability, the f.lux developers issued an official press release, praising Apple's efforts as "a big commitment and an important first step", though acknowledging itself as "the original innovators and leaders in this area". They also requested that Apple open up access for f.lux to enter the App Store, thereby supporting its mission in "furthering research in sleep and chronobiology". Following the native macOS availability, a f.lux developer posted in its forums in March 2017 that the macOS version was more limited in its actual impact by not reducing the levels of blue light enough. That was in direct contrast to the f.lux app, which significantly reduced the color.

Similar criticisms emerged in 2019, when Apple was reported to have demanded changes or the removal of apps involving parental controls and device usage tracking; the latter had been introduced to iOS 12 under the banner "Screen Time". After a report on the matter by The New York Times, which stated that Apple had, "removed 11 to 17 of the most downloaded screen-time and parental-control apps". Apple stated that these demands were due to privacy concerns surrounding their use of mobile device management features to gain system-level access—which it considered inappropriate outside of an enterprise setting, and a particular privacy risk to devices used by children.

=== App Store fees ===
iOS applications available through the App Store that require payments for features or membership are required to use Apple's iTunes payments system, granting the company a 30% cut of all transactions. This policy has been criticized as taking an unreasonably large amount of money for each transaction, with comparisons being made to the typical 1-5% cut that credit card companies require and the 1-10% cut that some online marketplaces require. Some experts have also compared the App Store fee to rent-seeking.

==== Spotify ====
In July 2015, music-streaming service Spotify sent an email to its iOS subscribers, urging them to cancel their App Store subscriptions, wait for expiration, and then sign up for paid membership through Spotify's website, bypassing the 30% App Store transaction fee and making the service more affordable. Approximately a year later, Recode reported that Spotify's general counsel Horacio Gutierrez had sent a letter to Apple's then-general counsel Bruce Sewell, saying that the company was "causing grave harm to Spotify and its customers" because it wouldn't approve an update to the Spotify app. Apple hadn't approved the new version due to "business model rules", requiring that Spotify use the iTunes payments system if it "wants to use the app to acquire new customers and sell subscriptions". Gutierrez severely criticized the chain of events, writing that "This latest episode raises serious concerns under both U.S. and EU competition law. ... It continues a troubling pattern of behavior by Apple to exclude and diminish the competitiveness of Spotify on iOS and as a rival to Apple Music, particularly when seen against the backdrop of Apple's previous anticompetitive conduct aimed at Spotify." He also described the App Store approval process as a "weapon to harm competitors". In a response reported by BuzzFeed News, Bruce Sewell said that "We find it troubling that you are asking for exemptions to the rules we apply to all developers and are publicly resorting to rumors and half-truths about our service", adding that "Our guidelines apply equally to all app developers, whether they are game developers, e-book sellers, video-streaming services or digital music distributors; and regardless of whether or not they compete against Apple". Sewell further claimed that the company "did not alter our behavior or our rules" when introducing its own Apple Music streaming service and that there was "nothing in Apple's conduct" to support anti-competitive claims. Zach Epstein of BGR opined that Spotify was angry because "it's not a non-profit" that did not have free rein over its app built on another company's service, and concluded with the remark that "Apparently, Apple shouldn't be compensated for giving Spotify access to tens of millions of potential subscribers".

In August 2016, Spotify began "punishing" artists who offered Apple Music exclusives by featuring their content less prominently on its service and offering fewer promotional opportunities. In May 2017, Financial Times reported that Spotify, as well as several other companies, had filed a letter with the European Union, alleging that "some" operating systems, app stores and search engines had abused their "privileged position" to go from being "gateways" to "gatekeepers". A few days later, Reuters reported that the European Union was preparing new laws and legislation intended to handle conflicts between large corporations and smaller businesses, specifically in regards to "unfair trading practices". Another letter was sent in December 2017, once again accusing Apple of "regularly abusing" its position, and asking for regulators to step in and "ensure 'a level playing field'".

==== Fortnite ====
On August 13, 2020, Epic Games added a direct payment system to Fortnite in order to bypass Apple's App Store fees. In response, Apple removed the game from the App Store, preventing new players from downloading the game. On the same day, Epic Games released a video attacking Apple titled Nineteen-Eighty-Fortnite with similarities to the Apple advertisement 1984. Simultaneously, Epic released a complaint for Injunctive Relief against Apple. In September 2020, Epic Games and thirteen other companies launched the Coalition for App Fairness which aims for better conditions for the inclusion of apps in the app store.

=== iTunes ===
Apple had controversy regarding the online sales of music in the European Union where, as a single market, customers are free to purchase goods and services from any member state. iTunes Stores forced consumers and other music buyers to iTunes-only sites by restricting content purchases to the country from which the customers' payment details originated, which in turn forced users in some countries to pay higher prices. On December 3, 2004, the British Office of Fair Trading referred to the iTunes Music Store to the European Commission for violation of EU free-trade legislation. Apple commented that they did not believe they violated EU law, but were restricted by legal limits to the rights granted to them by the music labels and publishers. PC World commented that it appeared that "the Commission's main target is not Apple but the music companies and music rights agencies, which work on a national basis and give Apple very little choice but to offer national stores".

==== Alleged collusion with record labels ====
In May 2015, it was reported that the U.S. Department of Justice and Federal Trade Commission were beginning to investigate Apple for engaging in a cartel with major record labels that discourage them from offering free, ad-supported streaming of their music online, in order to push users towards a re-launch of the subscription-based Beats Music service. In particular, it was alleged that Apple had pushed labels to pull their music from the freemium tier of competing service Spotify (a service which has cut into Apple's music sales revenue), and offered to pay Universal Music Group the equivalent of YouTube's licensing fees with the label in exchange for pulling its content from the service.

== Media relations ==
Apple maintains secrecy around its products and its practices, tightly controlling information regarding product launches, deliberately passing out misinformation in an effort to find leakers and keep the media unsure of Apple Inc.'s current developments. The company maintains strict control over workflow and access to products in development to ensure that leaks do not occur, providing information to employees on a need to know basis. Many attribute Apple's secrecy to Steve Jobs's reclusive nature where "he has always kept things close to the vest ... and only confided in relatively few people."

Apple only engages in public relations activity for the most significant products and milestones, and reporters are provided information about a finished product to focus on changes that Apple wishes to emphasize.

== See also ==
- Timeline of Apple Inc. products
- Typography of Apple Inc.
