= Chris Capossela =

American businessman (born 1969)

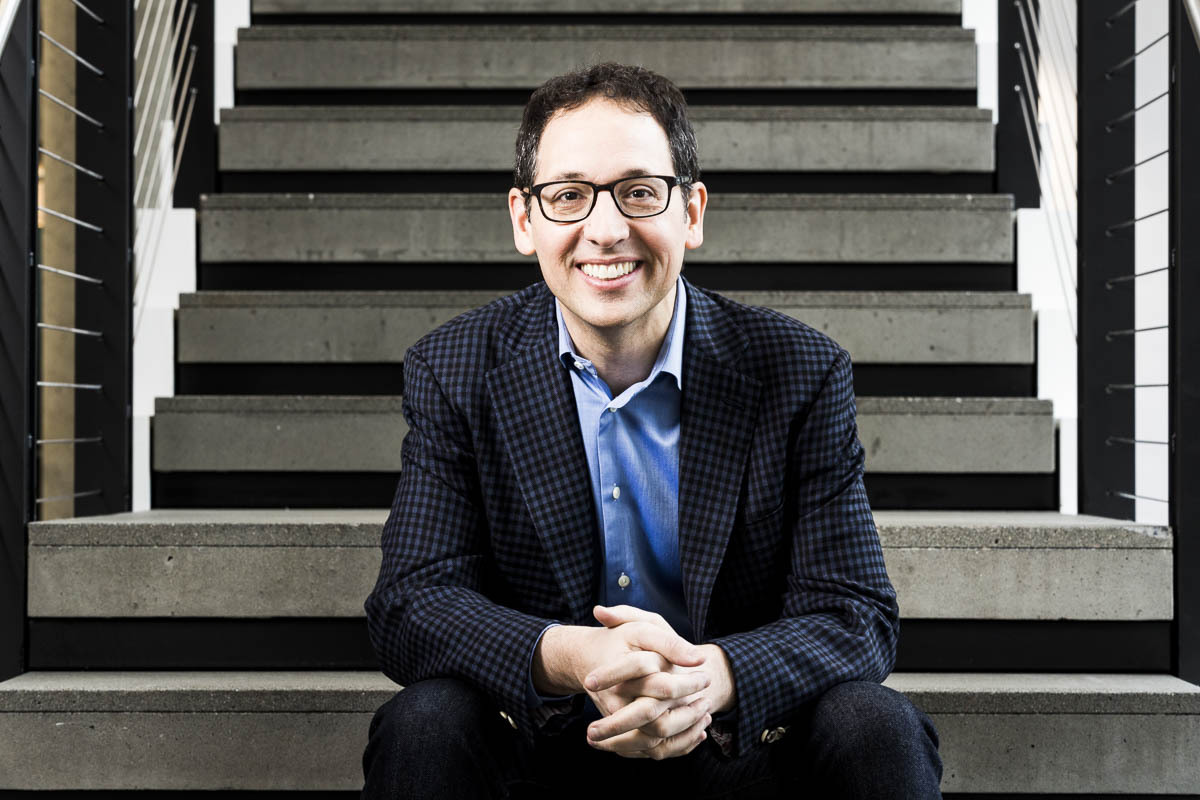
- Capossela in 2018
- Born: 1969 (age 56–57); Boston, Massachusetts, U.S.
- Education: Harvard University
- Occupation: Marketing executive
- Children: 2

Chris Capossela (born 1969) is an American former Microsoft executive who was its chief marketing officer for nearly all of the period from 2011 to 2023. Capossela's career at Microsoft includes roles as Bill Gates' speech assistant, Corporate Vice President of the Consumer Channels Group and marketing leadership of the company's Microsoft Office group. He also serves as board chair of the nonprofit Worldreader.

== Early and personal life ==
Chris Capossela was born and raised in Boston's North End. He worked alongside his two brothers, mother and father at his family's Italian restaurant. They lived in an apartment above the restaurant.

Capossela, his wife and two daughters live in Seattle, Washington. Capossela is a board member for a 501(c)(3) global non-profit called Worldreader, an organization that provides people in the developing world with free access to a library of digital books via e-readers and mobile phones.

== Education and career ==
Capossela began attending Harvard University in nearby Cambridge, Massachusetts, in 1987, graduating in 1991 with a B.A. in Economics. He joined Microsoft immediately after graduating, moving from his hometown of Boston to Seattle, WA.

In 1997, Capossela was selected for a two-year assignment as Speech Assistant to Microsoft CEO Bill Gates. In 1998, Capossela was demonstrating Windows 98 plug and play on stage with Gates at the COMDEX Conference when the computer became unresponsive and displayed the Blue Screen of Death. In 1999, Capossela relocated to Paris to lead business operations for Microsoft's Europe, Middle East and Africa (EMEA) region, before returning to Redmond in 2001 to assume leadership of Microsoft Project. Capossela was promoted to Corporate Vice President of the Microsoft Office division in 2003, a role he held until 2011, when he took on leadership of Microsoft's Consumer Channels Group.

In 2014, Microsoft CEO Satya Nadella promoted Capossela to chief marketing officer, overseeing marketing across consumer and commercial audiences for all Microsoft services and products, corporate communications, brand, advertising and research. Capossela took over the role from his predecessor Mich Mathews. In 2016, Microsoft consolidated its marketing and consumer sales organizations into the Marketing and Consumer Business group, adding business growth for consumer and device sales, Microsoft Advertising business and Microsoft Stores to Capossela's responsibilities.
