= It just works =

"It just works" is a catchphrase used by:

- Marketing of Apple Inc., especially by past CEO Steve Jobs
- Todd Howard of Bethesda Game studios
- JoJo's Bizarre Adventure about the character King Crimson
