= Rob Janoff =

American graphic designer

Rob Janoff is an American graphic designer known for his work in corporate branding, advertising, and television commercials. He gained recognition for designing the iconic Apple logo in 1977. Janoff has contributed to design projects for IBM and Intel.

== Early life ==
Janoff was born and raised in Culver City, California. He obtained his degree from San Jose State University, where he initially majored in industrial design. Later, he shifted his focus on graphic design.

== Career ==
In 1970, Janoff began working for several small Silicon Valley agencies.

In 1977, he joined Regis McKenna located in Palo Alto, California. While working in this position, he was chosen to design the corporate identity package of the Apple Computer for Steve Jobs, the only direction given to him being, "don't make it cute". What he submitted was an apple with a bite out of it. The bite was included so that people did not mistake the apple for a cherry or another fruit. The logo's colorful stripes represented the fact that Apple computers featured color screens. Each stripe was printed in its own specially mixed color, which Jobs approved because he felt that vivid colors improved people's emotional response. Rob also created ads and printed materials for Apple. The basic design of his Apple logo is still in use by the company today, but it has had many elements changed along the way.

Janoff later worked for agencies established in New York City and Chicago such as Chiat/Day where he designed print, TV advertising and branding for numerous national and international clients. Over the past six years, he has established a digital agency with his Australian business partner, Joel Bohm.

In 2019, Rob published his book Taking a Bite out of the Apple: A Graphic Designer's Tale, a nonfiction memoir aimed at young adults.

As of 2024, Rob resides in Chicago, but he travels as part of his work creating branding outcomes for companies across a range of industries. He is also a speaker who has delivered keynote addresses and classes in design for universities and academic facilities, including the Eastern Mediterranean University in Cyprus.
