= Mich Mathews =

British businesswoman

Mich Mathews (born 1968, United Kingdom) was the senior vice president for Microsoft's Central Marketing Group. She oversaw the company's global marketing function, including a diverse set of businesses and audiences.

Mathews has been featured in the Newsweek article "10 Power Women on Getting Ahead" Advertising Age has named Mich Mathews as number 21 in their 2009 Power Players, citing the Bing, Windows and "I'm a PC" pushes.
