= I'm a PC =

Microsoft television advertising campaign

Sean Siler, a Microsoft employee featured in the ad campaign resembles John Hodgman's "PC" character in Apple's ads

An unidentified woman revealing herself as a PC user while underwater in a shark cage

"I'm a PC" (also known as Pride) is a television advertising campaign created for Microsoft by ad agency Crispin Porter + Bogusky (CPB). The series first began to appear in September, 2008. The new series of commercials replace those that featured the pairing of Jerry Seinfeld and Bill Gates.

The $300 million advertising campaign was designed to challenge Apple's Get a Mac campaign, in which a Microsoft Windows PC is personified as an uninteresting office employee overly concerned with work, by showing everyday people to be PC users, thus breaking the perceived stereotype depicted in the Get a Mac commercials.

== Campaign ==
The ad series features prominent and popular individuals saying "I'm a PC" and has appearances by common international users as well as personalities such as writer Deepak Chopra, mixed martial artist Rashad Evans, actress Eva Longoria, photographer Geoff Green and singer Pharrell Williams.

The campaign was created by the CPB advertising agency and exhibited normal PC users to be found everywhere. It was the second phase of Microsoft's 2008 efforts to displace the ubiquity of Apple's "Get a Mac" ads, which portrayed the Mac as "cool and intuitive" and the PC as "boring and clunky". The Microsoft spots typically opened with an image of Sean Siler, an actual Microsoft employee dressed as John Hodgman's personification of a PC stating lines such as "I'm a PC, and I've been made into a stereotype" and "I'm a PC, and I am not alone."

The composition was initially made to resemble that of the Apple campaign, as Siler resembles Hodgman, the "PC" counterpart to Justin Long as a Mac in the Apple commercials.

The advertisements are also interspersed with various non-famous users who proclaim "I'm a PC" from a variety of places and in a number of methods. The intent is to demonstrate how PC users are ordinary people.

=== Windows 7 ===
Touting the then-upcoming Windows 7 as Microsoft's best ever operating system, Steve Ballmer said during his CES 2009 presentation "That's why we say, 'I'm a PC and proud of it'!".

Upon the release of Windows 7, Microsoft aired several advertisements under this campaign demonstrating the features of their new operating system. The ads typically focus on one person and end with the tagline "I'm a PC and Windows 7 was my idea."
