= Switch (advertising campaign) =

Ad campaign by Apple Computer Inc.

Switchers was an advertising campaign launched by Apple Computer on June 10, 2002. It featured what the company referred to as "real people" who had "switched" from the Microsoft Windows platform to the Mac. An international television and print ad campaign directed users to a website where various "myths" about the Mac platform were "dispelled". The television commercials were directed by Errol Morris.

== Switchers ==
A young woman who appeared in the commercials, Ellen Feiss, became an internet celebrity. Feiss was a friend of Morris's son Hamilton Morris, who also appeared in a commercial.

Localized versions of the commercials, with local "switchers", aired in Iceland and Japan.

Certain ads featured celebrities, such as Tony Hawk, DJ Q-Bert, Yo-Yo Ma, Kelly Slater, Will Ferrell and members of De La Soul.

== Campaign ==
The Switch campaign, while distinctive, was not very effective, and was gradually phased out in 2003. This can be somewhat blamed, however, for the Macintosh lineup as the iMac G3 was becoming obsolete while the new iMac G4 that was showcased was considerably more expensive than comparable Wintel offerings. The advertising concept of the Mac's advantages over the PC was dropped in favor for the Get a Mac campaign in 2006.

Due to the simplicity of the ad, many parodies surfaced on the net shortly after the campaign started. Most of the parodies lamented features they had lost due to the switch, such as the ability to play popular computer games and use of the right mouse button. In what seemed like a parody, but was not, Microsoft's marketing team created a web page titled "Confessions of a Mac to PC Convert", but Microsoft removed it for being fraudulent and misleading, even to the point of having a stock photograph used.

The background music of the Switch Ads is "Spit" by John Murphy. The music was produced for TBWA Chiat Day by Kendall Marsh of Mental Music Productions, Sherman Oaks, CA.

== See also ==
- Get a Mac
- Think different
