= Get a Mac =

Television advertising campaign for Apple Inc.

John Hodgman as PC and Justin Long as Mac

Get a Mac was a television advertising campaign created for Apple by TBWA\Media Arts Lab, the company's advertising agency, that ran from 2006 to 2009. The advertising campaign ran in the United States, Canada, Australia, New Zealand, the United Kingdom, Japan, and Germany.

== Synopsis ==
The Get a Mac advertisements follow a standard template. They open to a plain white background, and a man dressed in casual clothes introduces himself as an Apple Mac computer ("Hello, I'm a Mac."), while a man in a more formal suit-and-tie combination introduces himself as a Microsoft Windows personal computer ("And I'm a PC.").

The two then act out a brief vignette, in which the capabilities and attributes of Mac and PC are compared, with PC—characterized as formal and somewhat polite, though uninteresting and overly concerned with work—often being frustrated by the more laid-back Mac's abilities. The commercials end with a still shot of a Mac desktop or laptop displaying the Mac logo on its screen. The earlier commercials in the campaign involved a general comparison of the two computers, whereas the later ones mainly concerned Windows Vista and Windows 7.

The original American advertisements star actor Justin Long as the Mac, and author and humorist John Hodgman as the PC, and were directed by Phil Morrison. The British campaign stars comedic duo Robert Webb as Mac and David Mitchell as PC, while the Japanese campaign features the comedic duo Rahmens. Several of the British and Japanese advertisements, although based on the originals, were slightly altered to better target the new audiences.

The Get a Mac campaign is the successor to the Switch ads which were first broadcast in 2002. Both campaigns were filmed against a plain white background. Apple's former CEO, Steve Jobs, introduced the campaign during a shareholder's meeting the week before the campaign started. The campaign also coincided with a change of signage and employee apparel at Apple retail stores detailing reasons to switch to Macs.

The advertisements play on perceived weaknesses of non-Mac personal computers, especially those running Microsoft Windows, of which PC is clearly intended to be a parody, and corresponding strengths possessed by the Mac OS (such as immunity to circulating viruses and spyware targeted at Microsoft Windows). The target audience of these ads is not devoted PC users, but rather those who are more likely to "swing" towards Apple. Apple realized that many consumers who chose PCs did so because of their lack of knowledge of the Apple brand. With this campaign, Apple was targeting those users who may not consider Macs when purchasing but may be persuaded to when they view these ads. Each of the ads is about 30 seconds in length and is accompanied by a song called "Having Trouble Sneezing", which was composed by Mark Mothersbaugh.

== Effectiveness ==
Before the campaign's launch, Apple had seen lower sales in 2005–06. One month after the start of the "Get a Mac" campaign, Apple saw an increase of 200,000 Macs sold, and at the end of July 2006, Apple announced that it had sold 1.3 million Macs. Apple had an overall increase in sales of 39% for the fiscal year ending September 2006.

== Criticism ==
In an article for Slate magazine, Seth Stevenson criticized the campaign as being too "mean spirited", suggesting, "isn't smug superiority (no matter how affable and casually dressed) a bit off-putting as a brand strategy?".

Writing in The Guardian, Charlie Brooker criticized the casting of comedians Mitchell and Webb in the UK campaign, noting that in the sitcom they were then starring in together, Peep Show, "Mitchell plays a repressed, neurotic underdog, and Webb plays a selfish, self-regarding poseur... So when you see the ads, you think, 'PCs are a bit rubbish yet ultimately lovable, whereas Macs are just smug, preening tossers.'"

PC Magazine Editor in Chief Lance Ulanoff criticized the campaign's use of the term "PC" to refer specifically to IBM PC compatible, or Wintel, computers, noting that this usage, though common, is incorrect, as the Macintosh is also a personal computer. In a 2008 column, he recommended that the characters instead introduce themselves as "a Mac PC" and "a Windows PC", adding, "Of course, the ads would then be far less effective, because consumers might realize that the differences Apple is trying to tout aren't quite as huge as Apple would like you to believe."

== Similar campaigns ==
=== I'm a PC ===
Microsoft responded to the Get a Mac advertising campaign in late 2008 by releasing the I'm a PC campaign, featuring Microsoft employee Sean Siler as a John Hodgman look-alike. While Apple's ads show personifications of both Mac and PC systems, the Microsoft ads show PC users instead proudly defining themselves as PCs.

=== Justin Gets Real ===
In the wake of the Mac transition to Apple silicon, in March 2021, Intel made a similar advertising campaign, known as Justin Gets Real, featuring Justin Long as himself promoting Intel PCs over Macs. These commercials typically start with Long stating, "Hello, I'm a..." against the familiar plain white background before he suddenly says, "Justin, just a real person doing a real comparison between Mac and PC.". He is then seen interacting with the computers and/or others using them in a real-world setting.

=== There's Only One Ozempic ===
In 2026, the duo reunited after 17 years for Novo's "There's Only One Ozempic" campaign. Long personifies Ozempic, emphasizing its FDA-approved uses, while Hodgman represents competing GLP-1s.

== See also ==
- Apple evangelist
- Apple Inc. advertising
- Apple Switch ad campaign
- Cola Wars
- Comparative advertising
