= Mac (computer) =

Family of personal computers made by Apple

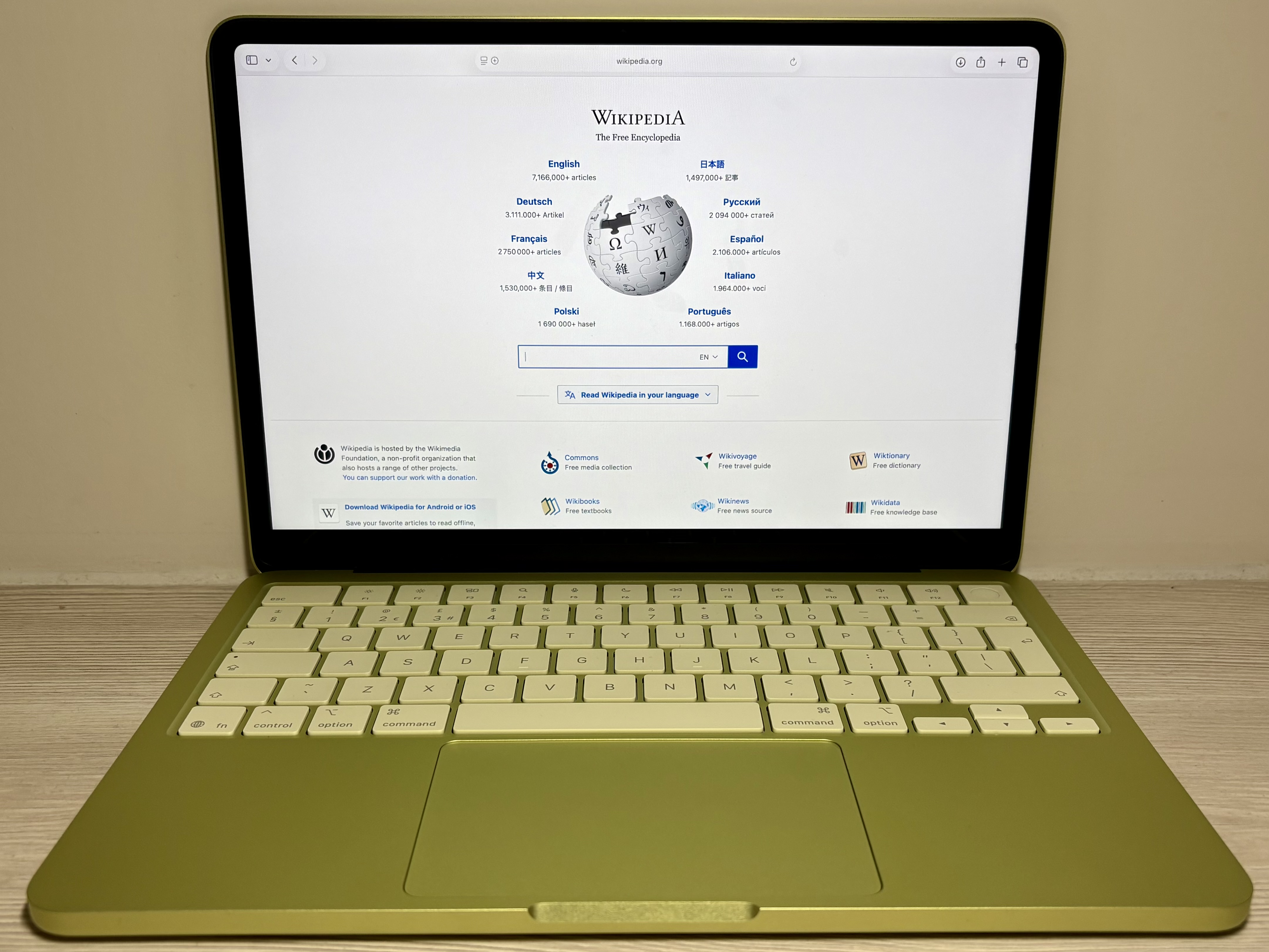
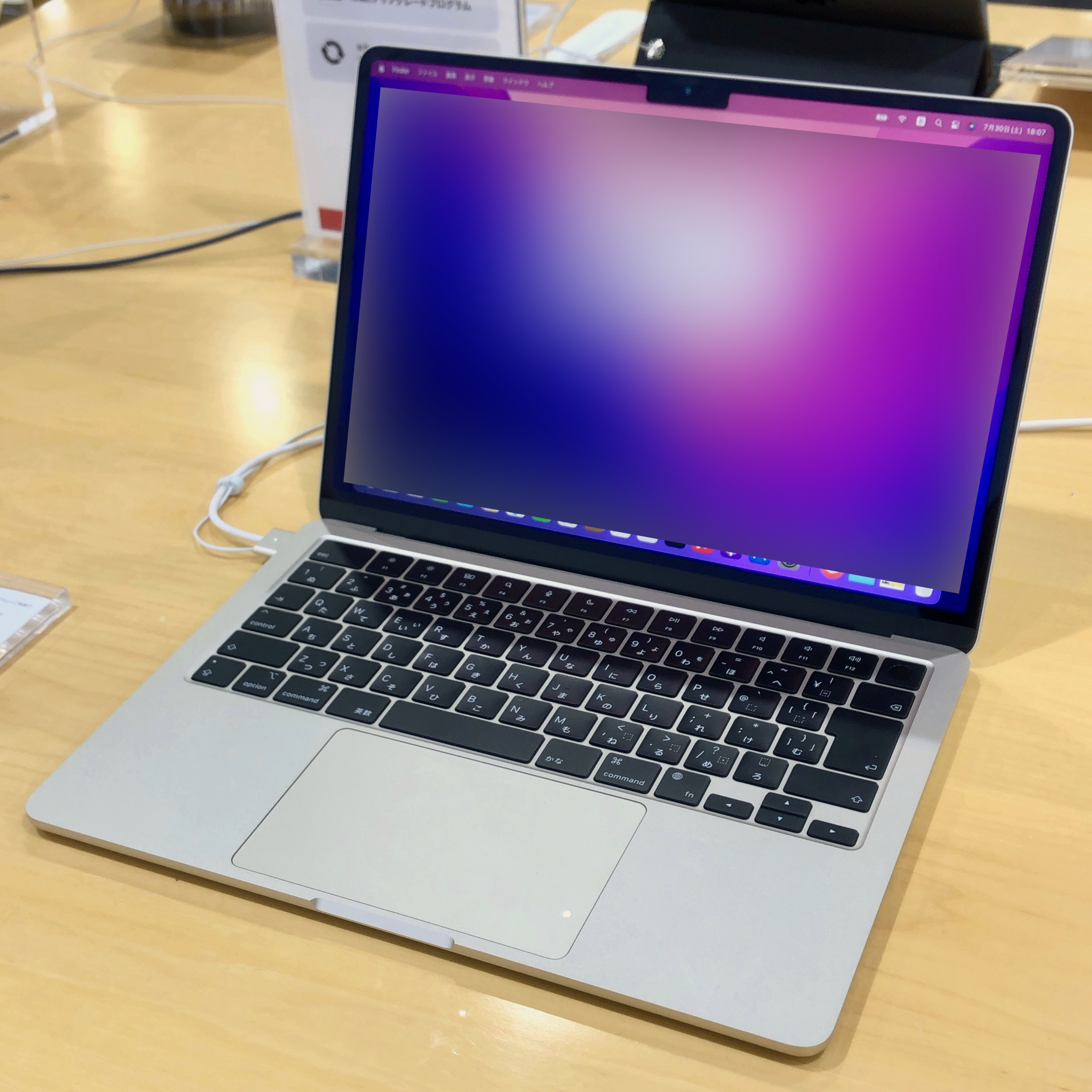
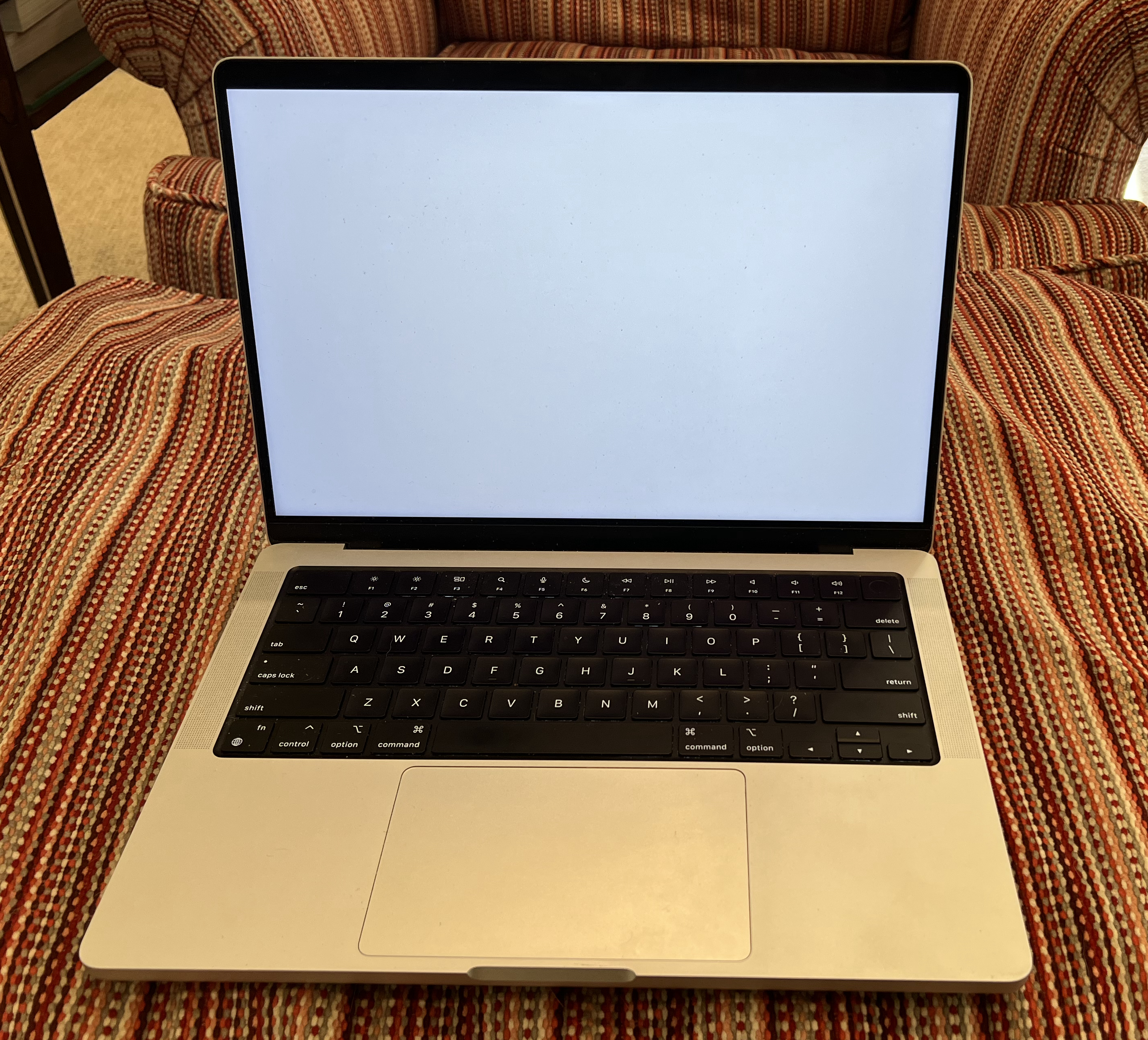
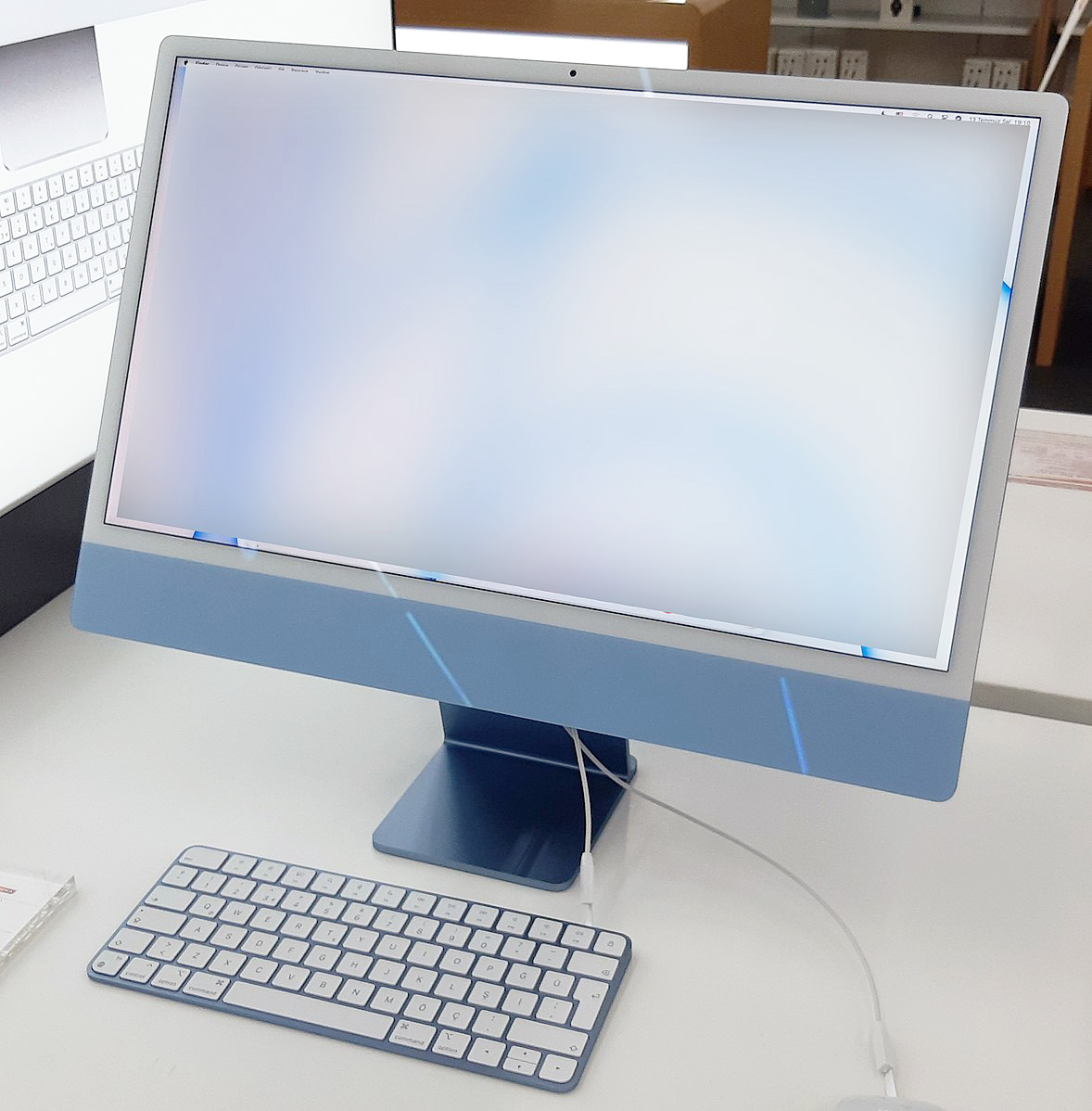
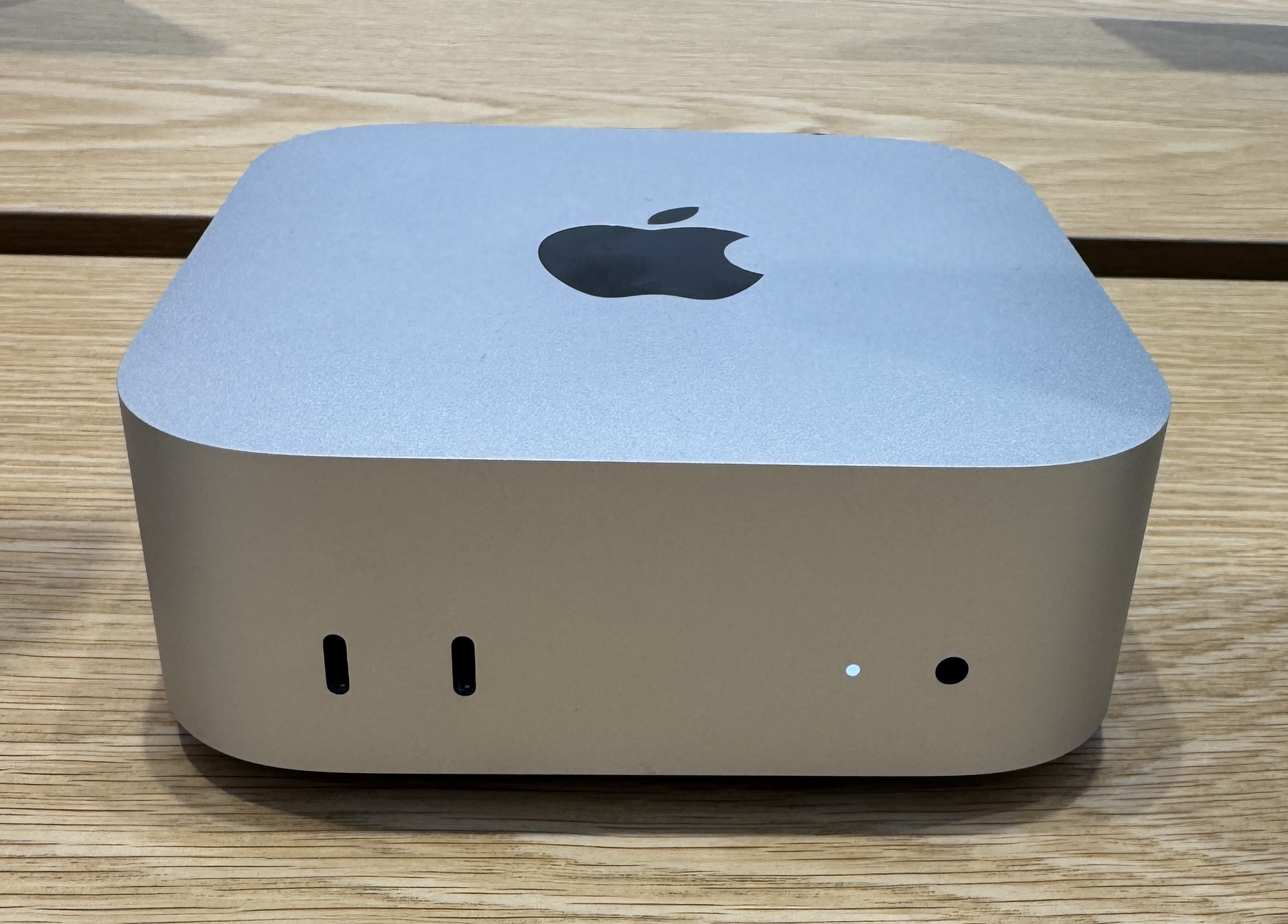
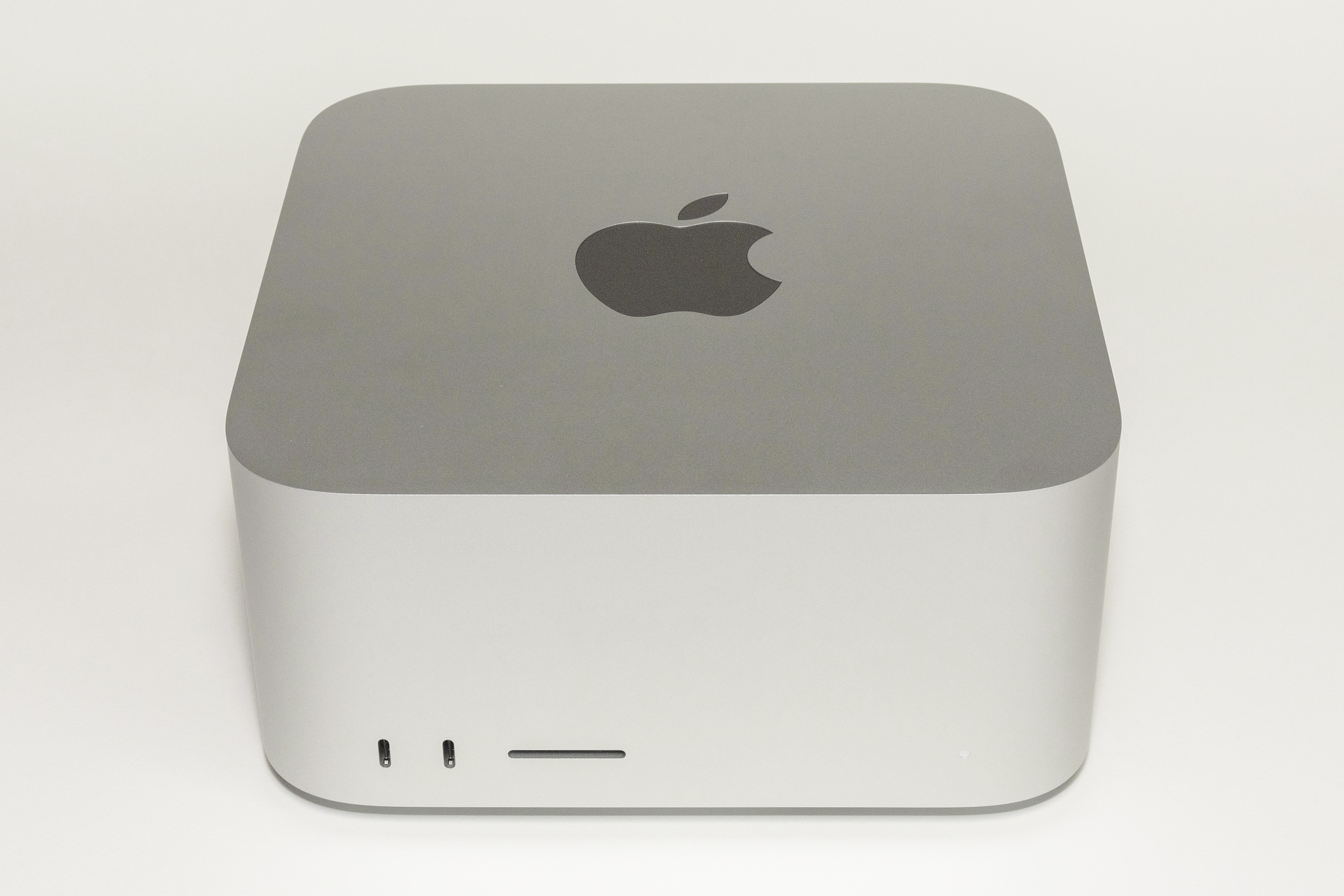
- Various current models of Mac computers. Top row, left to right: The MacBook Neo, MacBook Air, and MacBook Pro laptops Bottom row, left to right: The iMac, Mac Mini, and Mac Studio desktops
- Also known as: Macintosh
- Developer: Apple
- Manufacturer: Apple
- Type: Desktop computers, all-in-one computers, laptop computers (current)
- Released: January 24, 1984; 42 years ago
- Lifespan: 1984–present
- Operating system: macOS "Classic" Mac OS (formerly)
- Related: Apple II; Apple Lisa iPad
- Website: www.apple.com/mac

Mac is a brand of personal computers designed and marketed by Apple since 1984. The name is short for Macintosh (its official name until 1999), (Note: While the "Macintosh" name has been less used since 1999, it is still the formal name for Mac, such as on the "About" page of Finder ("The Macintosh Desktop Experience") and the default name for the startup volume ("Macintosh HD"). It was also used by Steve Jobs at Macworld 2007 prior to announcing the iPhone.) a reference to the McIntosh apple. As of 2026, the product lineup includes the MacBook Neo, MacBook Air and MacBook Pro laptops, and the iMac, Mac Mini and Mac Studio desktops. Macs are currently sold with Apple's Unix-based macOS operating system, which is not licensed to other manufacturers and exclusively bundled with Mac computers. This operating system replaced Apple's original Macintosh operating system, which has variously been named System, Mac OS, and Classic Mac OS.

Jef Raskin conceived the Macintosh project in 1979, which was usurped and redefined by Apple co-founder Steve Jobs in 1981. The original Macintosh was launched in January 1984 at US$2,495 (equivalent to $7,700 in 2025), after Apple's "1984" advertisement during Super Bowl XVIII. A series of incrementally improved models followed, sharing the same integrated case design. In 1987, the Macintosh II brought color graphics, but was priced as a professional workstation and not a personal computer. Beginning in 1994 with the Power Macintosh, the Mac transitioned from Motorola 68000 series processors to PowerPC. Macintosh clones by other manufacturers were also briefly sold afterward. The line was refreshed in 1998 with the launch of the iMac G3, reinvigorating the line's competitiveness against commodity IBM PC compatibles. Macs transitioned to Intel x86 processors by 2006 along with new sub-product lines MacBook and Mac Pro. Since 2020, Macs have transitioned to Apple silicon chips based on ARM64.

== History ==
=== 1979–1984: Development ===
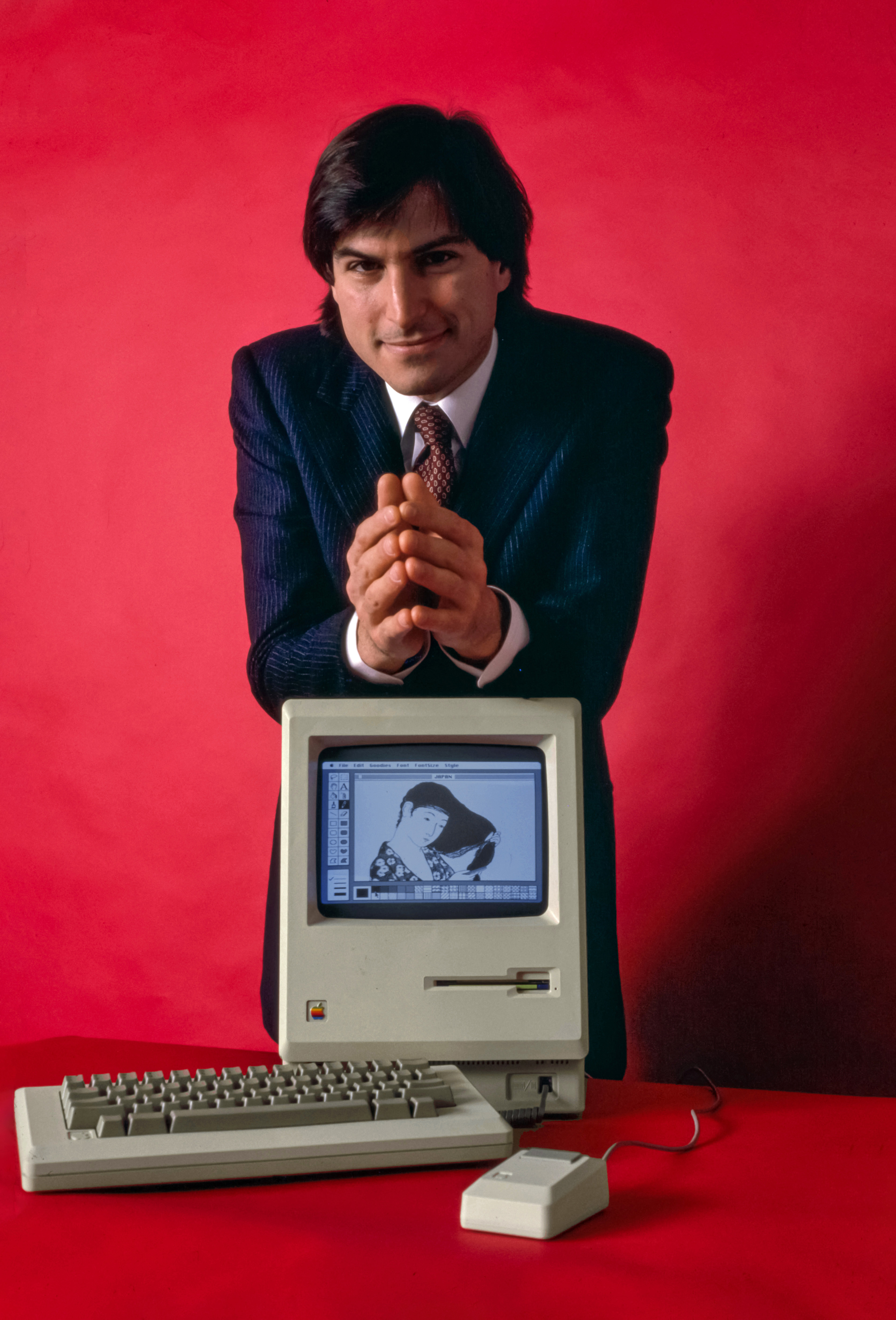
Steve Jobs, here photographed by Bernard Gotfryd, introduced the Macintosh computer in January 1984. Shown on the Mac screen is a shin-hanga by Goyō Hashiguchi titled in Japanese: 髪梳ける女; lit. 'hair-combing woman'. (Display the shin-hanga image.)

In the late 1970s, the Apple II became one of the most popular computers, especially in education. After IBM introduced the IBM PC in 1981, its sales surpassed the Apple II. In response, Apple introduced the Lisa in 1983. The Lisa's graphical user interface was inspired by strategically licensed demonstrations of the Xerox Star. Lisa surpassed the Star with intuitive direct manipulation, including the ability to drag and drop files, double-click to launch applications, and move or resize windows by clicking and dragging instead of going through a menu. However, hampered by its high price of $9,995 (equivalent to $35,000 in 2025) and lack of available software, the Lisa was commercially unsuccessful.

Parallel to the Lisa's development, a skunkworks team at Apple was working on the Macintosh project. Conceived in 1979 by Jef Raskin, Macintosh was envisioned as an affordable, easy-to-use computer for the masses. Raskin named the computer after his favorite type of apple, the McIntosh. The initial team consisted of Raskin, hardware engineer Burrell Smith, and Apple co-founder Steve Wozniak. In 1981, Steve Jobs was removed from the Lisa team and joined the Macintosh team. He gradually took control of the project, aided by Wozniak's temporary absence after an airplane crash. Under Jobs, the Mac grew to resemble the Lisa, with a mouse and a more intuitive graphical interface, at a quarter of the Lisa's price.

=== 1984–1991: Launch and early success ===
Upon its January 1984 launch, the first Macintosh was described as "revolutionary" by The New York Times. Sales initially met projections, but dropped due to the machine's low performance, its single floppy disk drive, which required frequent disk swapping, and its initial lack of applications. Author Douglas Adams said of it, "…what I (and I think everybody else who bought the machine in the early days) fell in love with was not the machine itself, which was ridiculously slow and underpowered, but a romantic idea of the machine. And that romantic idea had to sustain me through the realities of actually working on the 128K Mac." Most of the original Macintosh team left Apple, and some followed Jobs to found NeXT after he was forced out by CEO John Sculley.

The first Macintosh nevertheless generated enthusiasm among buyers and some developers, who rushed to develop entirely new programs for the platform, including PageMaker, MORE, and Excel. Apple soon released the Macintosh 512K with improved performance and an external floppy drive. The Macintosh is credited with popularizing the graphical user interface. Jobs's fascination with typography gave it an unprecedented variety of fonts and type styles like italics, bold, shadow, and outline. It was the first mass-market WYSIWYG computer, and, due in large part to PageMaker and Apple's LaserWriter printer, it ignited the desktop publishing market, turning the Macintosh from an early disappointment into a notable success. Steven Levy called desktop publishing the Mac's "Trojan horse" in the enterprise market, as colleagues and executives tried these Macs and were seduced into requesting one for themselves. PageMaker creator Paul Brainerd said: "You would see the pattern. A large corporation would buy PageMaker and a couple of Macs to do the company newsletter. The next year you'd come back and there would be thirty Macintoshes. The year after that, three hundred". Ease of use for computer novices was another incentive. Peat Marwick was the first, largest, and for some time the only large corporate customer; although the company said that its auditors used Macs because of their portability and not the user interface, after it merged with the IBM PC-using KMG to form KPMG in 1987, the combined company retained Macs after studying both platforms.

In late 1985, Bill Atkinson, one of the few remaining employees to have been on the original Macintosh team, proposed that Apple create a Dynabook, Alan Kay's concept for a tablet computer that stores and organizes knowledge. Sculley rebuffed him, so he adapted the idea into a Mac program, HyperCard, whose cards store any information—text, image, audio, video—with the memex-like ability to semantically link cards together. HyperCard was released in 1987 and bundled with every Macintosh.

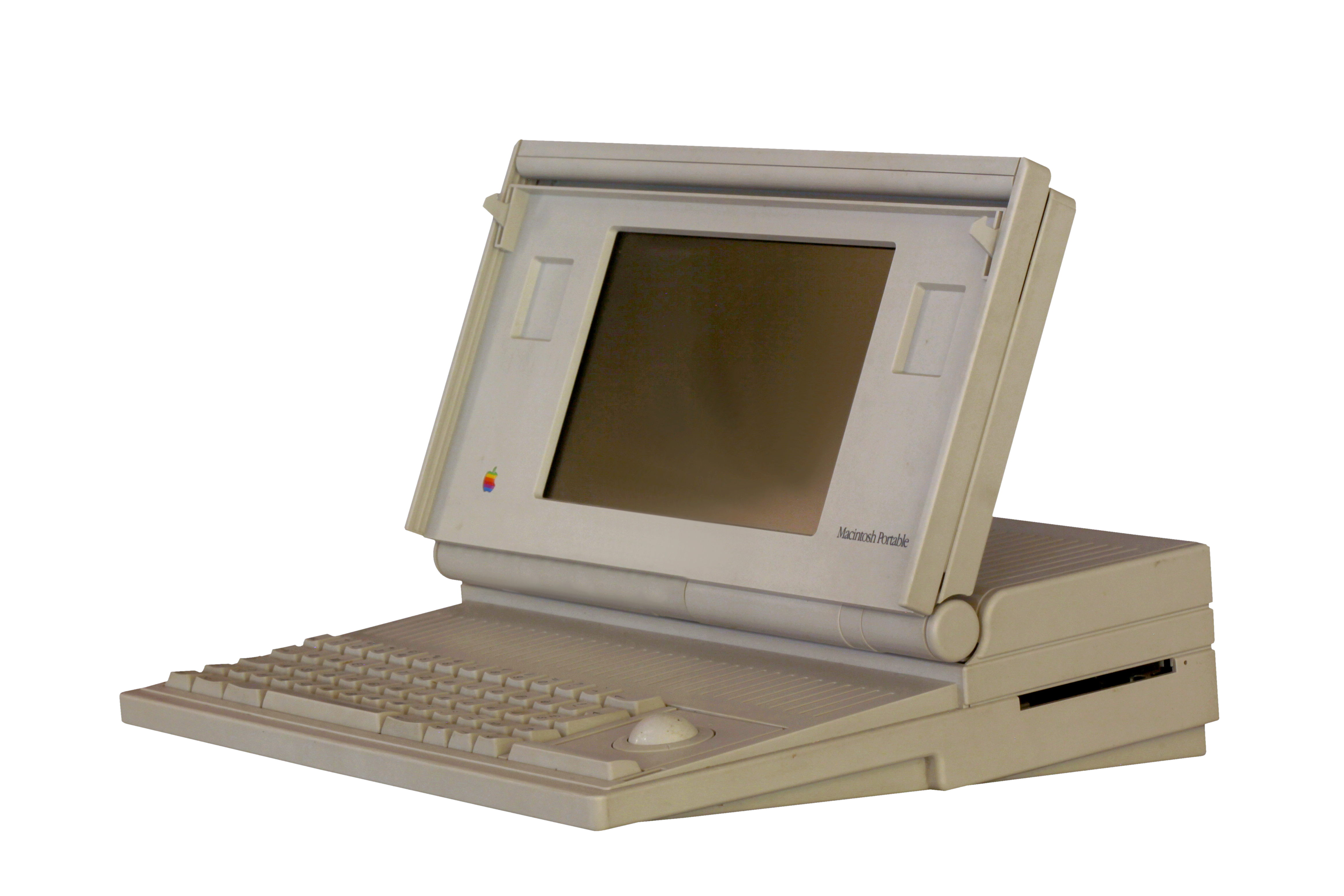
Macintosh Portable

In the late 1980s, Jean-Louis Gassée, a Sculley protégé who had succeeded Jobs as head of the Macintosh division, made the Mac more expandable and powerful to appeal to tech enthusiasts and enterprise customers. This strategy led to the successful 1987 release of the Macintosh II, which appealed to power users and gave the lineup momentum. However, Gassée's "no-compromise" approach foiled Apple's first laptop, the Macintosh Portable, which has many uncommon power user features, but is almost as heavy as the original Macintosh at twice its price. Soon after its launch, Gassée was fired.

Since the Mac's debut, Sculley had opposed lowering the company's profit margins, as Macintoshes were priced far above entry-level MS-DOS compatible computers. Steven Levy said that though Macintoshes were superior, the cheapest Mac cost almost twice as much as the cheapest IBM PC compatible. Sculley also resisted licensing the Mac OS to competing hardware vendors, who could have undercut Apple on pricing and jeopardized its hardware sales, as IBM PC compatibles had done to IBM. These early strategic steps caused the Macintosh to lose its chance at becoming the dominant personal computer platform. Though senior management demanded high-margin products, a few employees disobeyed and set out to create a computer that would live up to the original Macintosh's slogan, "[a] computer for the rest of us", which the market clamored for. In a pattern typical of Apple's early era, of skunkworks projects like Macintosh and Macintosh II lacking adoption by upper management who were slow to recognize the projects' merit, this once-renegade project was actually endorsed by senior management following market pressures. In 1990, Apple introduced the Macintosh LC and the more affordable Macintosh Classic, the first model priced under $1,000 (equivalent to $2,500 in 2025). Between 1984 and 1989, Apple had sold one million Macs, and another 10 million over the following five years.

=== 1991–1998: PowerPC transition and sales decline ===
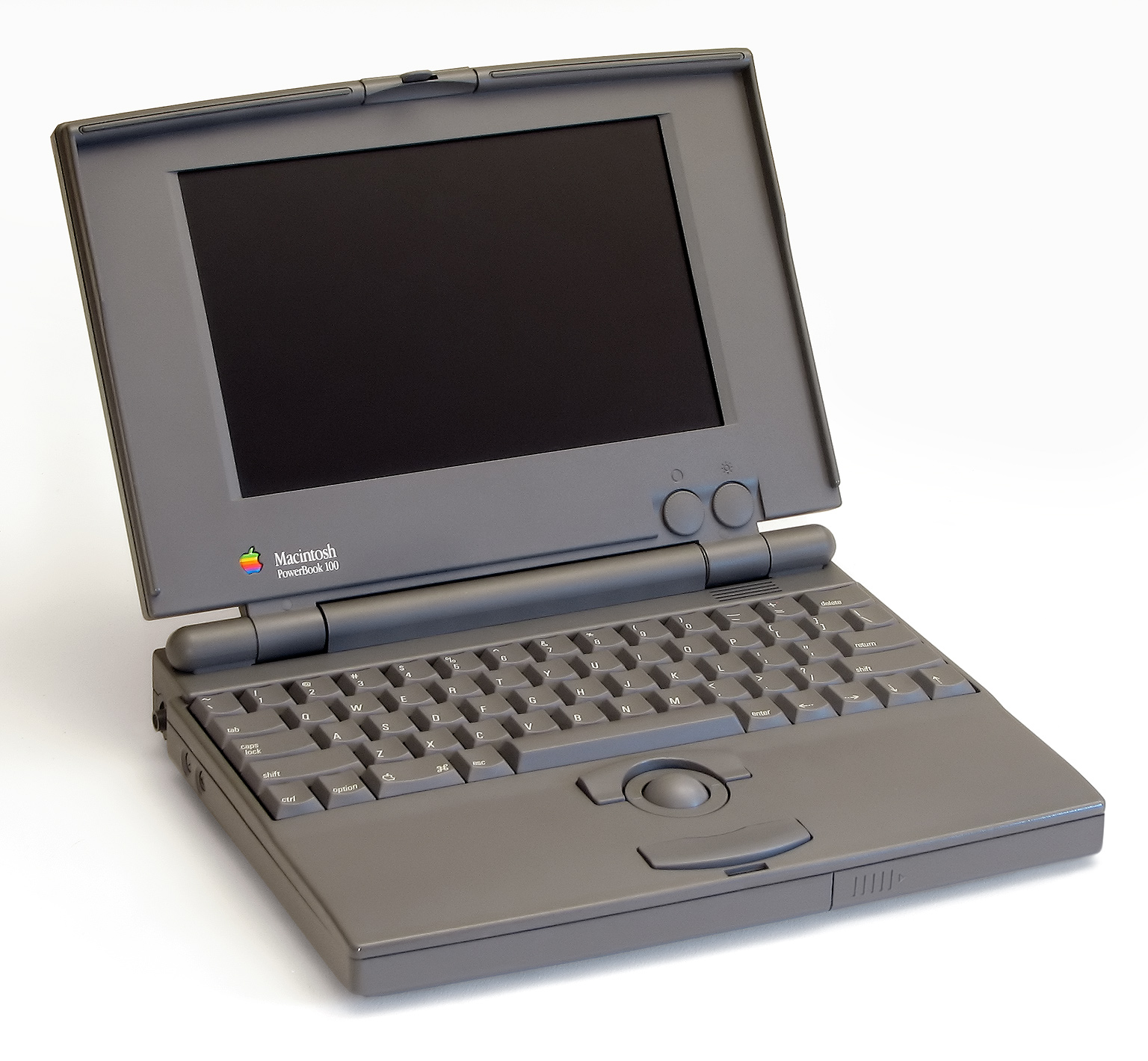
PowerBook 100

In 1991, the Macintosh Portable was replaced with the smaller and lighter PowerBook 100, the first laptop with a palm rest and trackball in front of the keyboard. The PowerBook brought $1 billion of revenue within one year, and became a status symbol. By then, the Macintosh represented 10% to 15% of the personal computer market. Fearing a decline in market share, Sculley co-founded the AIM alliance with IBM and Motorola to create a new standardized computing platform, which led to the creation of the PowerPC processor architecture, and the Taligent operating system. In 1992, Apple introduced the Macintosh Performa line, which "grew like ivy" into a disorienting number of barely differentiated models in an attempt to gain market share. This backfired by confusing customers, but the same strategy soon afflicted the PowerBook line. Michael Spindler continued this approach when he succeeded Sculley as CEO in 1993. He oversaw the Mac's transition from Motorola 68000 series to PowerPC and the release of Apple's first PowerPC machine, the well-received Power Macintosh.

Many new Macintoshes suffered from inventory and quality control problems. The 1995 PowerBook 5300 was plagued with quality problems, with several recalls after some units reportedly caught fire. Pessimistic about Apple's future, Spindler repeatedly attempted to sell Apple to other companies, including IBM, Kodak, AT&T, Sun, and Philips. In a last-ditch attempt to fend off Windows, Apple relented and started a Macintosh clone program, which allowed other manufacturers to make System 7 computers. However, this only cannibalized the sales of Apple's higher-margin machines. Meanwhile, Windows 95 was an instant hit with customers. Apple was struggling financially as its attempts to produce a System 7 successor had all failed with Taligent, Star Trek, and Copland, and its hardware was stagnant. The Mac was no longer competitive, and its sales entered a tailspin. Corporations abandoned Macintosh in droves, replacing it with cheaper and more technically sophisticated Windows NT machines for which far more applications and peripherals existed. Even some Apple loyalists saw no future for the Macintosh. Once the world's second largest computer vendor after IBM, Apple's market share declined precipitously from 9.4% in 1993 to 3.1% in 1997. Bill Gates was ready to abandon Microsoft Office for Mac, which would have slashed any remaining business appeal the Mac had. Gil Amelio, Spindler's successor, failed to negotiate a deal with Gates.

In 1996, Spindler was succeeded by Amelio, who searched for an established operating system to acquire or license for the foundation of a new Macintosh operating system. He considered BeOS, Solaris, Windows NT, and NeXT's NeXTSTEP, eventually choosing NeXTSTEP. Announced on December 20, 1996, Apple acquired NeXT on February 7, 1997, returning its co-founder, Steve Jobs.

NeXT had developed the mature NeXTSTEP operating system with strong multimedia and Internet capabilities. NeXTSTEP was also popular among programmers, financial firms, and academia for its object-oriented programming tools for rapid application development. In an eagerly anticipated speech at the January 1997 Macworld trade show, Steve Jobs previewed Rhapsody, a merger of NeXTSTEP and Mac OS as the foundation of Apple's new operating system strategy. At the time, Jobs only served as advisor, and Amelio was released in July 1997. Jobs was formally appointed interim CEO in September, and permanent CEO in January 2000. To continue turning the company around, Jobs streamlined Apple's operations and began layoffs. He negotiated a deal with Bill Gates in which Microsoft committed to releasing new versions of Office for Mac for five years, investing $150 million in Apple, and settling an ongoing lawsuit in which Apple alleged that Windows had copied the Mac's interface. In exchange, Apple made Internet Explorer the default Mac browser. The deal was closed hours before Jobs announced it at the August 1997 Macworld.

Jobs refocused Apple. The Mac lineup had been incomprehensible, with dozens of hard-to-distinguish models. He streamlined it into four quadrants, a laptop and a desktop each for consumers and professionals. Apple also discontinued several Mac accessories, including the StyleWriter printer and the Newton PDA. These changes were meant to refocus Apple's engineering, marketing, and manufacturing efforts so that more care could be dedicated to each product. Jobs also stopped licensing Mac OS to clone manufacturers, which had cost Apple ten times more in lost sales than it received in licensing fees. Jobs made a deal with the largest computer reseller, CompUSA, to carry a store-within-a-store that would better showcase Macs and their software and peripherals. According to Apple, the Mac's share of computer sales in those stores went from 3% to 14%. In November, the online Apple Store launched with built-to-order Mac configurations without an intermediary. When Tim Cook was hired as chief operations officer in March 1998, he closed Apple's inefficient factories and outsourced Mac production to Taiwan. Within months, he rolled out a new ERP system and implemented just-in-time manufacturing principles. This practically eliminated Apple's costly unsold inventory, and within one year, Apple had the industry's most efficient inventory turnover.

=== 1998–2005: "Mac" rebranding and return to profitability ===
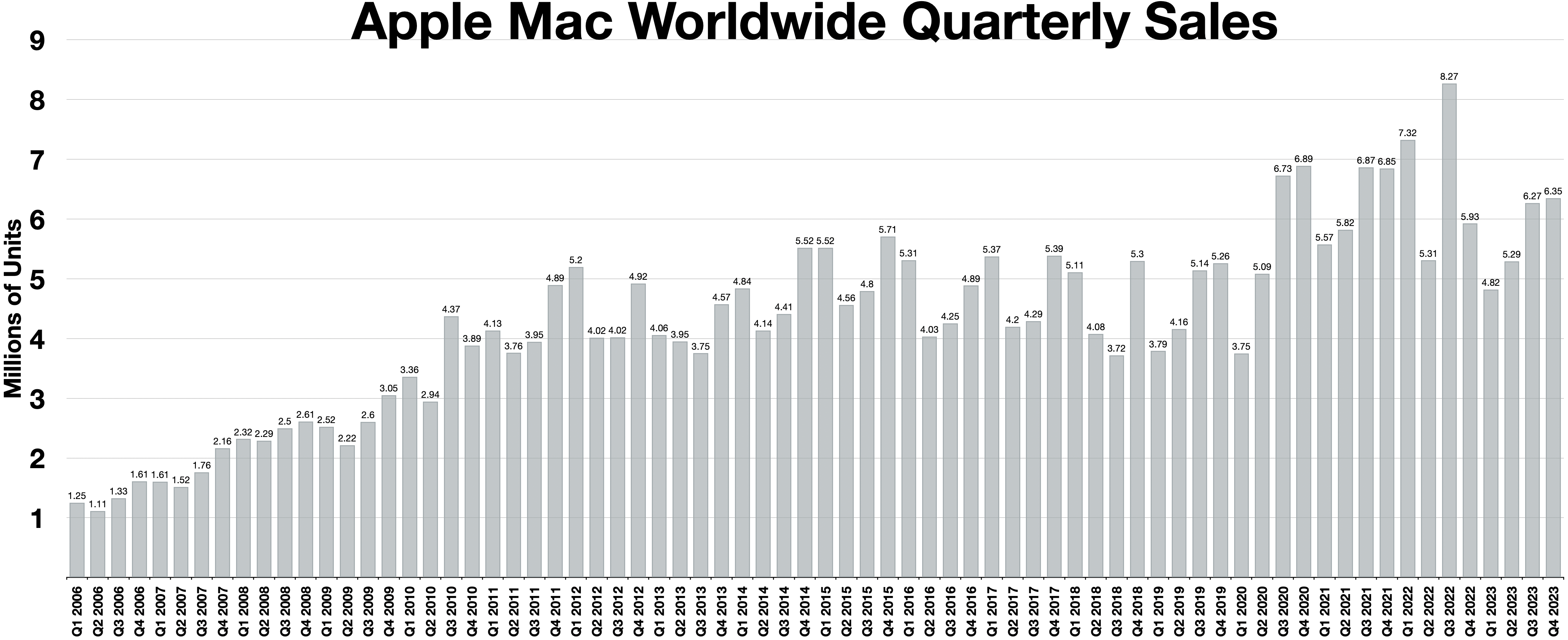
Mac worldwide quarterly sales from 2006 to 2023

The iMac G3's marketing heavily emphasizes its design and Internet capabilities for consumers.

Jobs's top priority was "to ship a great new product". The first was the iMac G3, an all-in-one computer that was meant to make the Internet intuitive and easy to access. While PCs came in functional beige boxes, Jony Ive gave the iMac a radical and futuristic design, meant to make the product less intimidating. Its oblong case was made of translucent plastic in Bondi blue, later revised with many colors. Ive added a handle on the back to make the computer more approachable. Jobs declared the iMac would be "legacy-free", replacing ADB and SCSI with an infrared port and cutting-edge USB ports. Though USB had industry backing, it was still absent from most PCs and USB 1.1 was only standardized one month after the iMac's release. He also controversially removed the floppy disk drive and replaced it with a CD drive. The iMac was unveiled in May 1998 and released in August. It was an immediate commercial success and became the fastest-selling computer in Apple's history, with 800,000 units sold before the year ended. Vindicating Jobs on the Internet's appeal to consumers, 32% of iMac buyers had never used a computer before, and 12% were switching from PCs. The iMac reestablished the Mac's reputation as a trendsetter: for the next few years, translucent plastic became the dominant design trend in numerous consumer products.

Apple knew it had lost its chance to compete in the Windows-dominated enterprise market, so it prioritized design and ease of use to make the Mac more appealing to average consumers and even teens. The "Apple New Product Process" was launched as a more collaborative product development process for the Mac, using concurrent engineering principles. From then on, product development was no longer driven primarily by engineering with design treated as an afterthought. Instead, Ive and Jobs first defined a new product's "soul", before it was jointly developed by the marketing, engineering, and operations teams. The engineering team was led by the product design group, and Ive's design studio was the dominant voice throughout the development process.

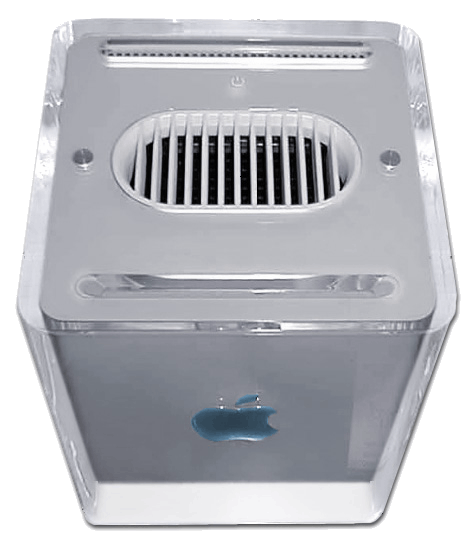
The Power Mac G4 Cube advanced Apple's industrial design culture and manufacturing processes.

The next two Mac products in 1999, the Power Mac G3 (nicknamed "Blue and White") and the iBook, introduced industrial designs influenced by the iMac, incorporating colorful translucent plastic and carrying handles. The iBook introduced several innovations: a strengthened hinge instead of a mechanical latch to keep it closed, ports on the sides rather than on the back, and the first laptop with built-in Wi-Fi. It became the best-selling laptop in the U.S. during the fourth quarter of 1999. The professional-oriented Titanium PowerBook G4 was released in 2001, becoming the lightest and thinnest laptop in its class, and the first laptop with a widescreen display; it also debuted a magnetic latch that secures the lid elegantly.

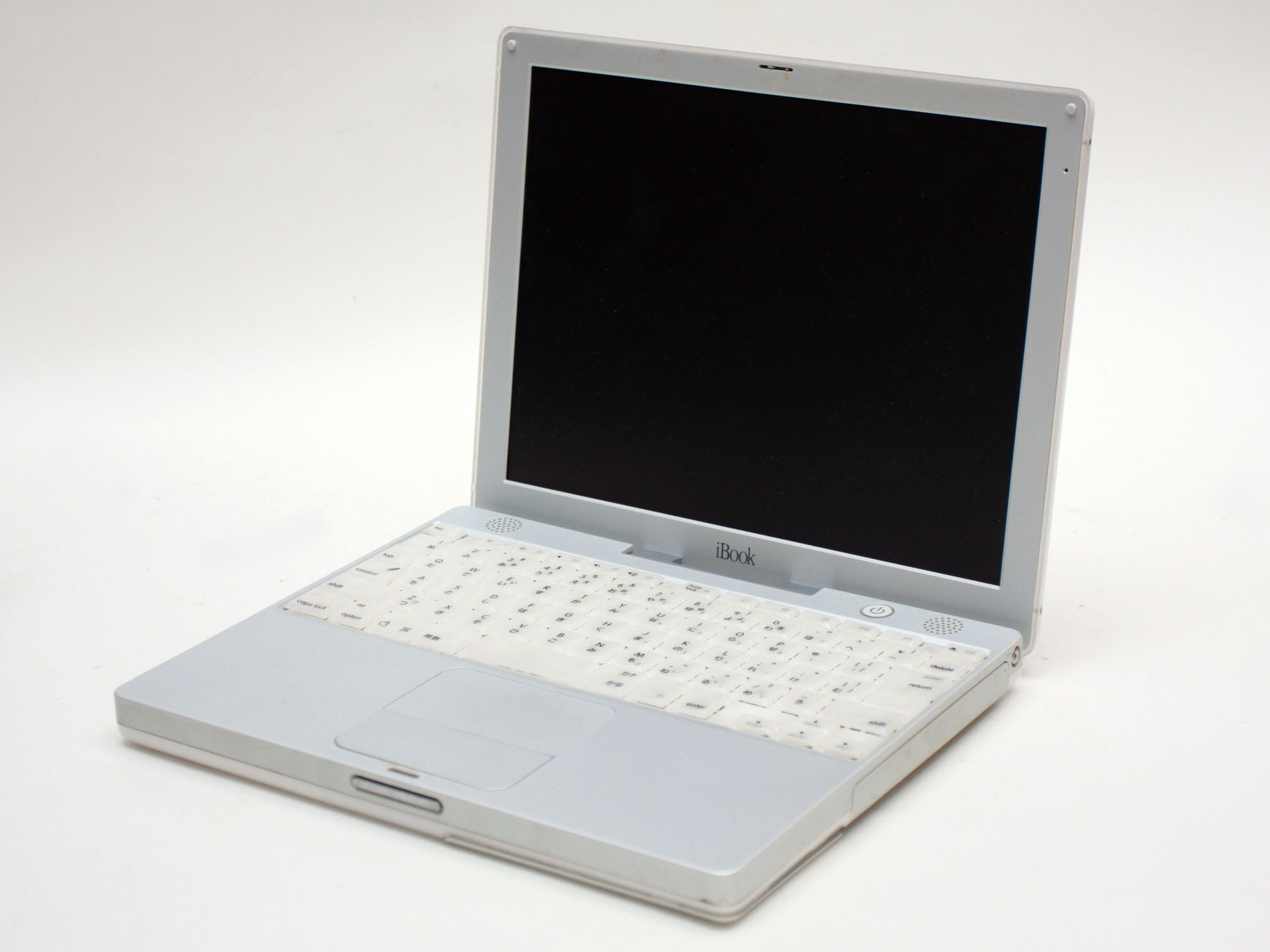
The Dual USB "Ice" iBook represents a design shift away from color, toward white polycarbonate.

The design language of consumer Macs shifted again from colored plastics to white polycarbonate with the introduction of the 2001 Dual USB "Ice" iBook. To increase the iBook's durability, it eliminated doors and handles, and gained a more minimalistic exterior. Ive attempted to go beyond the quadrant with Power Mac G4 Cube, an innovation beyond the computer tower in a professional desktop far smaller than the Power Mac. The Cube failed in the market and was withdrawn from sale after one year. However, Ive considered it beneficial, because it helped Apple gain experience in complex machining and miniaturization.

The development of a successor to the old Mac OS was well underway. Rhapsody had been previewed at WWDC 1997, featuring a Mach kernel and BSD foundations, a virtualization layer for old Mac OS apps (codenamed Blue Box), and an implementation of NeXTSTEP APIs called OpenStep (codenamed Yellow Box). Apple open-sourced the core of Rhapsody as the Darwin operating system. After several developer previews, Apple also introduced the Carbon API, which provided a way for developers to more easily make their apps native to Mac OS X without rewriting them in Yellow Box. Mac OS X was publicly unveiled in January 2000, introducing the modern Aqua graphical user interface, and a far more stable Unix foundation, with memory protection and preemptive multitasking. Blue Box became the Classic environment, and Yellow Box was renamed Cocoa. Following a public beta, the first version of Mac OS X, version 10.0 Cheetah, was released in March 2001.

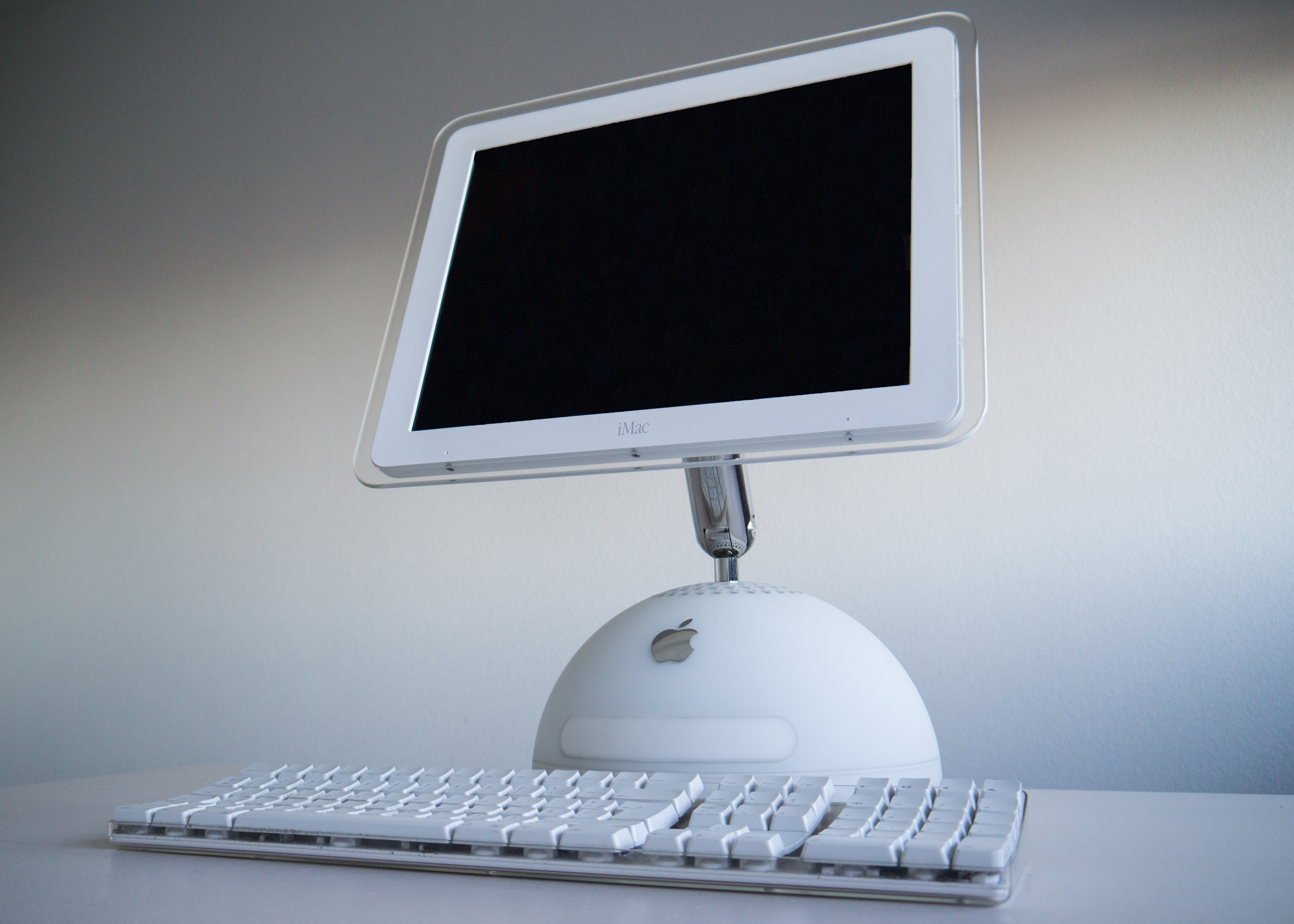
The "Sunflower" iMac G4 is an industrial design innovation.

In 1999, Apple launched its new "digital lifestyle" strategy of which the Mac became a "digital hub" and centerpiece with several new applications. In October 1999, the iMac DV gained FireWire ports, allowing users to connect camcorders and easily create movies with iMovie; the iMac gained a CD burner and iTunes, allowing users to rip CDs, make playlists, and burn them to blank discs. Other applications include iPhoto for organizing and editing photos, and GarageBand for creating and mixing music and other audio. The digital lifestyle strategy entered other markets, with the iTunes Store, iPod, iPhone, iPad, and the 2007 renaming from Apple Computer Inc. to Apple Inc. By January 2007, the iPod was half of Apple's revenues.

New Macs included the white "Sunflower" iMac G4. Ive designed a display to swivel with one finger, so that it "appear[ed] to defy gravity". In 2003, Apple released the aluminum 12-inch and 17-inch PowerBook G4, proclaiming the "Year of the Notebook". With the Microsoft deal expiring, Apple also replaced Internet Explorer with its new browser, Safari. The first Mac Mini was intended to be assembled in the U.S., but domestic manufacturers were slow and had insufficient quality processes, leading Apple to Taiwanese manufacturer Foxconn. The affordably priced Mac Mini desktop was introduced at Macworld 2005, alongside the introduction of the iWork office suite.

Serlet and Tevanian initiated a secret project at Steve Jobs's request in 2001 to propose selling Mac OS X on Vaio laptops to Sony executives. They demonstrated it at a golf event in Hawaii using the most expensive Vaio laptop they could acquire. However, because of poor timing, Sony refused, arguing that its Vaio sales had just begun to grow after years of difficulty.

=== 2005–2011: Intel transition and "back to the Mac" ===
With PowerPC chips falling behind in performance, price, and efficiency, Steve Jobs announced in 2005 the Mac transition to Intel processors, because the operating system had been developed for both architectures since the beginning. PowerPC apps ran using transparent Rosetta emulation, and Windows could boot natively using Boot Camp. This transition helped contribute to a few years of growth in Mac sales.

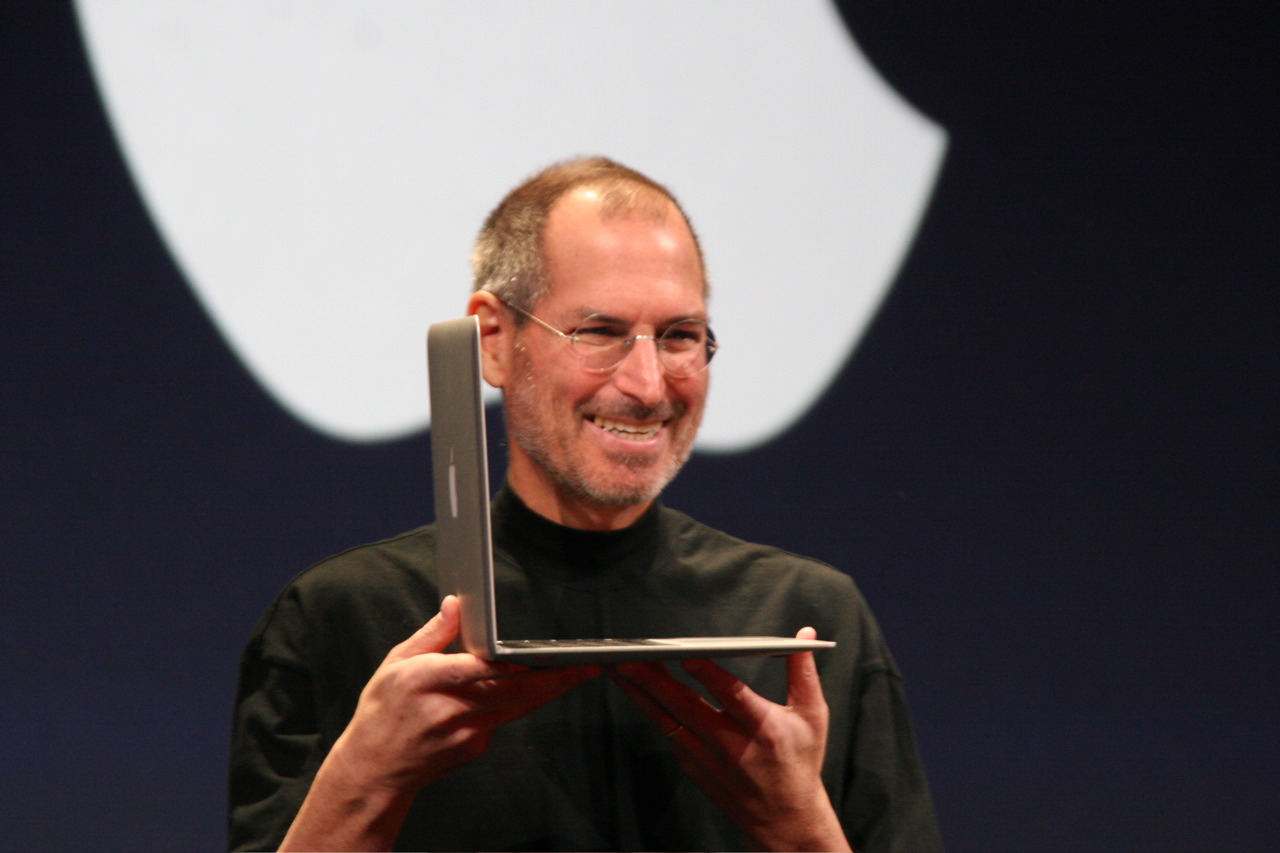
Steve Jobs unveiled the first MacBook Air at Macworld 2008.

After the iPhone's 2007 release, Apple began a multi-year effort to bring many iPhone innovations "back to the Mac", including multi-touch gesture support, instant wake from sleep, and fast flash storage. At Macworld 2008, Jobs introduced the first MacBook Air by taking it out of a manila envelope, touting it as the "world's thinnest notebook". The MacBook Air favors wireless technologies over physical ports, and lacked FireWire, an optical drive, and a replaceable battery. The Remote Disc feature accessed discs in other networked computers. A decade after its launch, journalist Tom Warren wrote that the MacBook Air had "immediately changed the future of laptops", starting the ultrabook trend. OS X Lion added new software features first introduced with the iPad, such as FaceTime, full-screen apps, document autosaving and versioning, and a bundled Mac App Store to replace software install discs with online downloads. It gained support for Retina displays, which had been introduced earlier with the iPhone 4. iPhone-like multi-touch technology was progressively added to all MacBook trackpads, and to desktop Macs through the Magic Mouse, and Magic Trackpad. The 2010 MacBook Air added an iPad-inspired standby mode, "instant-on" wake from sleep, and flash memory storage.

After criticism by Greenpeace, Apple improved the ecological performance of its products. The 2008 MacBook Air was free of toxic chemicals such as mercury, bromide, and PVC, and used smaller packaging. The enclosures of the iMac and unibody MacBook Pro were redesigned using more recyclable aluminum and glass.

On February 24, 2011, the MacBook Pro became the first computer to support Intel's new Thunderbolt connector, with two-way transfer speeds of 10 Gbit/s, and backward compatibility with Mini DisplayPort.

=== 2011–2018: Post-Jobs era ===
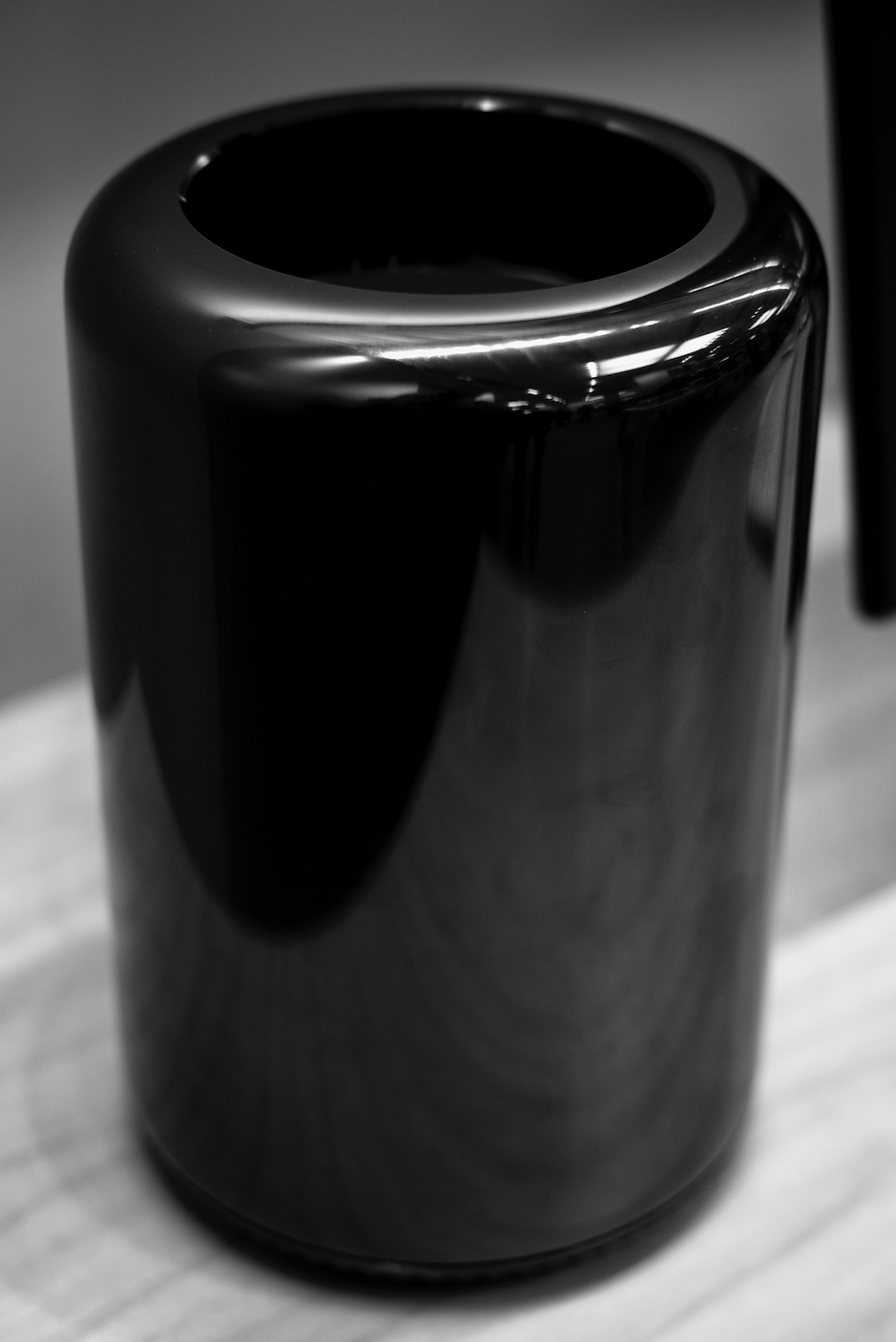
The 2013 Mac Pro was controversial among professional users. One of the reasons was the lack of internal expandability due to the absence of expansion slots or the like, which was a side-effect of the exotic and compact design (height c. 25 cm).

Due to deteriorating health, Steve Jobs resigned as CEO on August 24, 2011, after which he died that year on October 5. Tim Cook was named as his successor. Cook's first keynote address launched iCloud, moving the digital hub from the Mac to the cloud. In 2012, the MacBook Pro was refreshed with a Retina display, and the iMac was slimmed and lost its SuperDrive.

During Cook's first few years as CEO, Apple fought media criticisms that it could no longer innovate without Jobs. In 2013, Apple introduced a new cylindrical Mac Pro, with marketing chief Phil Schiller exclaiming "Can't innovate anymore, my ass!". The new model had a miniaturized design with a glossy dark gray cylindrical body and internal components organized around a central cooling system. Tech reviewers praised the 2013 Mac Pro for its power and futuristic design; however, it was poorly received by professional users, who criticized its lack of upgradability and the removal of expansion slots.

The iMac was refreshed with a 5K Retina display in 2014, making it the highest-resolution all-in-one desktop computer. The MacBook was reintroduced in 2015, with a completely redesigned aluminum unibody chassis, a 12-inch Retina display, a fanless low-power Intel Core M processor, a much smaller logic board, a new Butterfly keyboard, a single USB-C port, and a solid-state Force Touch trackpad with pressure sensitivity. It was praised for its portability, but criticized for its lack of performance, the need to use adapters to use most USB peripherals, and a high starting price of $1,299 (equivalent to $1,800 in 2025). In 2015, Apple started a service program to address a widespread GPU defect in the 15-inch 2011 MacBook Pro, which could cause graphical artifacts or prevent the machine from functioning entirely.

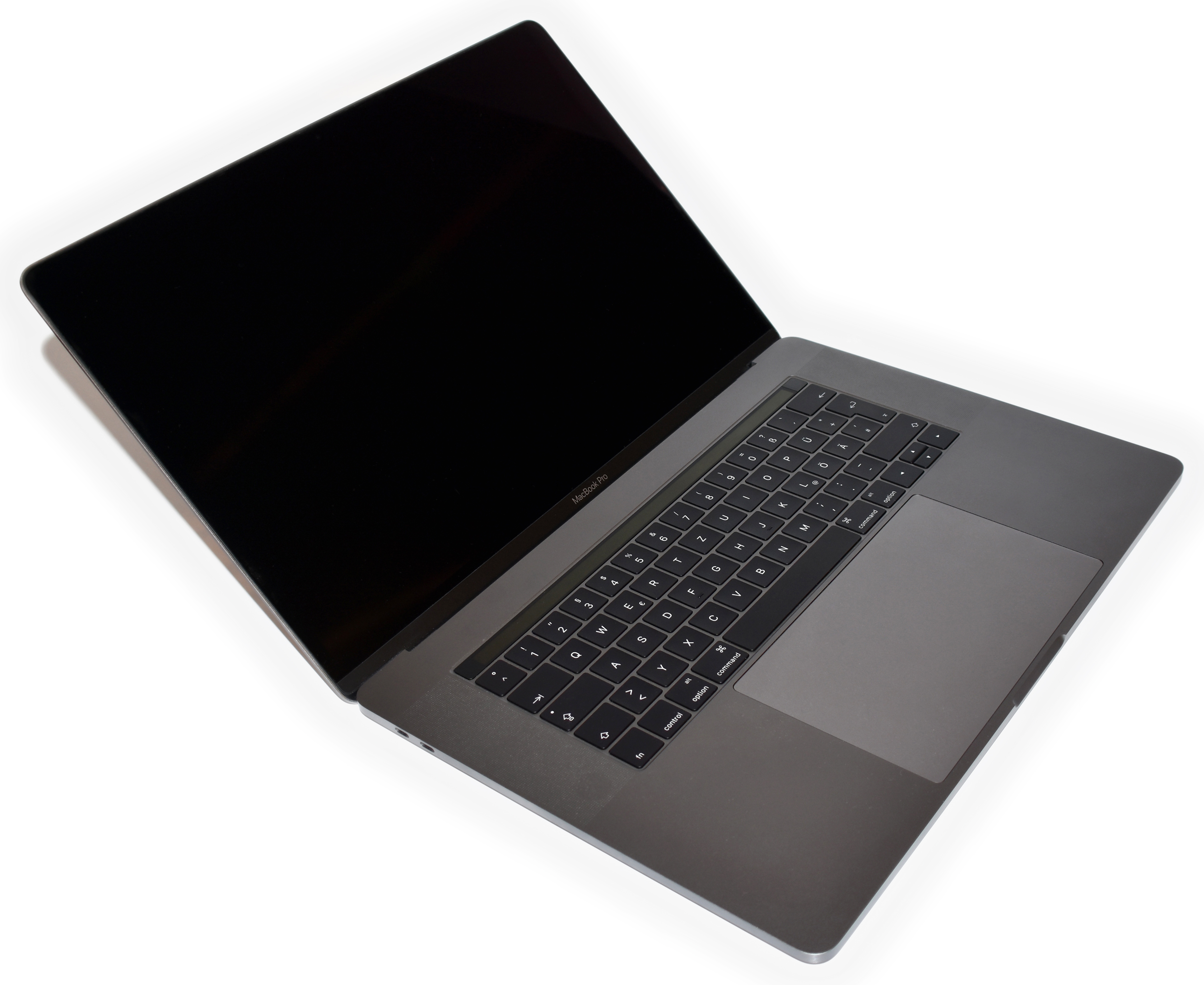
The 13-inch (330 mm) and 15-inch (380 mm) MacBook Pro models (2016–19) were criticized for their keyboards' unreliability and USB-C–only port configuration.

The Touch Bar MacBook Pro was released in October 2016. It was the thinnest MacBook Pro ever made, replaced all ports with four Thunderbolt 3 (USB-C) ports, gained a thinner "Butterfly" keyboard, and replaced function keys with the Touch Bar. The Touch Bar was criticized for making it harder to use the function keys by feel, as it offered no tactile feedback. Many users were also frustrated by the need to buy dongles, particularly professional users who relied on traditional USB-A devices, SD cards, and HDMI for video output. A few months after its release, users reported a problem with stuck keys and letters being skipped or repeated. iFixit attributed this to the ingress of dust or food crumbs under the keys, jamming them. Since the Butterfly keyboard was riveted into the laptop's case, it could only be serviced at an Apple Store or authorized service center. Apple settled a $50M class-action lawsuit over these keyboards in 2022. These same models were afflicted by "flexgate": when users closed and opened the machine, they would risk progressively damaging the cable responsible for the display backlight, which was too short. The $6 cable was soldered to the screen, requiring a $700 repair.

Senior Vice President of Industrial Design Jony Ive continued to guide product design toward simplicity and minimalism. Critics argued that he had begun to prioritize form over function, and was excessively focused on product thinness. His role in the decisions to switch to fragile Butterfly keyboards, to make the Mac Pro non-expandable, and to remove USB-A, HDMI and the SD card slot from the MacBook Pro were criticized.

The long-standing keyboard issue on MacBook Pros, Apple's abandonment of the Aperture professional photography app, and the lack of Mac Pro upgrades led to declining sales and a widespread belief that Apple was no longer committed to professional users. After several years without any significant updates to the Mac Pro, Apple executives admitted in 2017 that the 2013 Mac Pro had not met expectations, and said that the company had designed itself into a "thermal corner", preventing them from releasing a planned dual-GPU successor. Apple also unveiled its future product roadmap for professional products, including plans for an iMac Pro as a stopgap and an expandable Mac Pro to be released later. The iMac Pro was revealed at WWDC 2017, featuring updated Intel Xeon W processors and Radeon Pro Vega graphics.

In 2018, Apple released a redesigned MacBook Air with a Retina display, Butterfly keyboard, Force Touch trackpad, and Thunderbolt 3 USB-C ports. The Butterfly keyboard underwent three revisions, incorporating silicone gaskets in the key mechanism to prevent keys from being jammed by dust or other particles. However, many users continued to experience reliability issues with these keyboards, leading Apple to launch a program to repair affected keyboards free of charge. Higher-end models of the 15-inch 2018 MacBook Pro faced another issue where the Core i9 processor reached unusually high temperatures, reducing CPU performance through thermal throttling. Apple addressed this issue with a macOS supplemental update, blaming a "missing digital key" in the thermal management firmware.

The 2019 16-inch MacBook Pro and 2020 MacBook Air replaced the unreliable Butterfly keyboard with a redesigned scissor-switch Magic Keyboard. On the MacBook Pros, the Touch Bar and Touch ID were made standard, and the Esc key was detached from the Touch Bar and returned to being a physical key. At WWDC 2019, Apple unveiled a new Mac Pro with a larger case design that allowed hardware expandability, and introduced a new expansion module system (MPX) for modules such as the Afterburner card for faster video encoding. Almost every part of the new Mac Pro was user-replaceable, with iFixit praising its high user-repairability. It received positive reviews, with reviewers praising its power, modularity, quiet cooling, and Apple's increased focus on professional workflows.

=== 2018–present: Apple silicon transition and post-transition ===
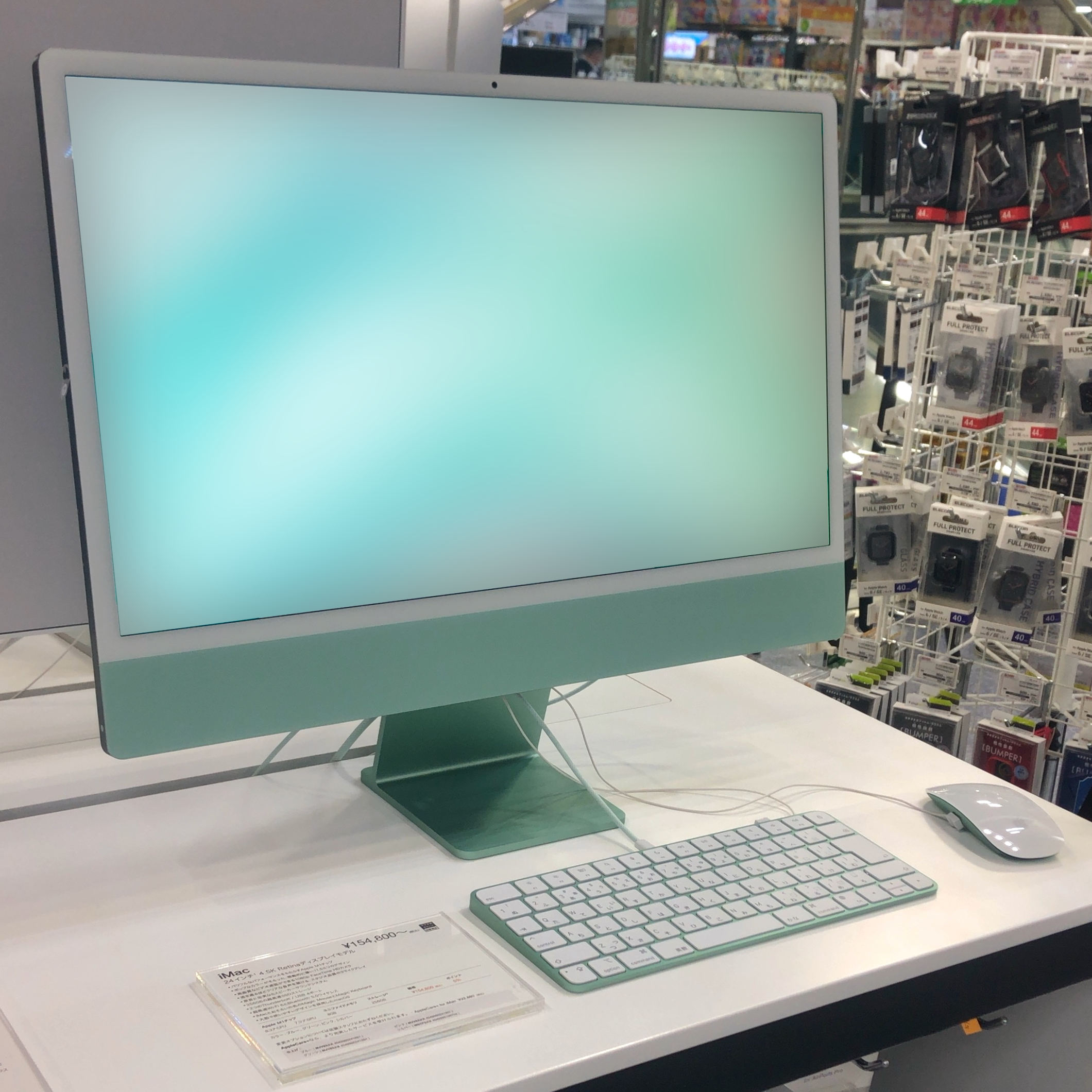
The 2021 iMac was praised for its colorful and slim design.

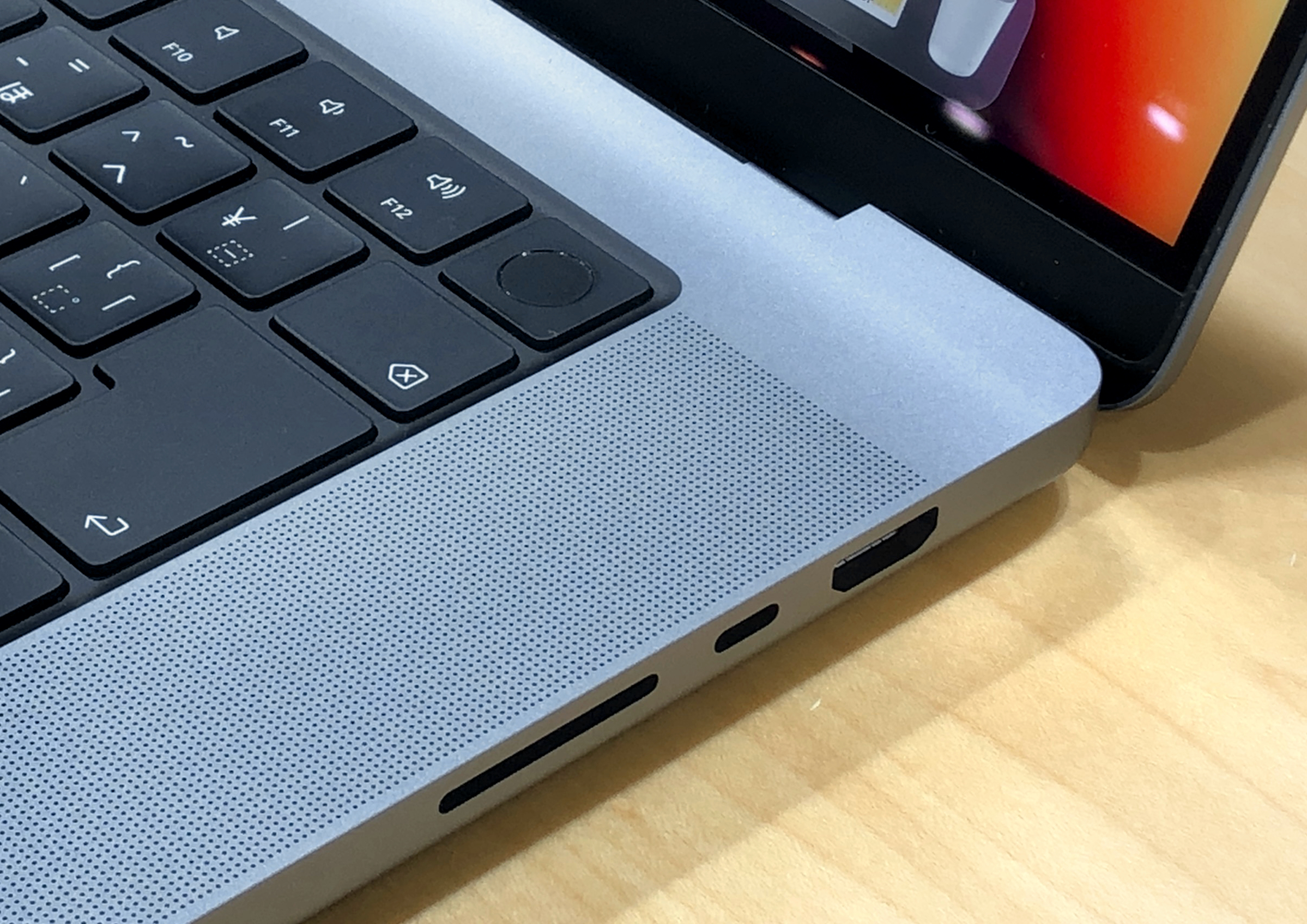
The 14-inch and 16-inch MacBook Pros in 2021 had significantly improved port selection (pictured) and thermals.

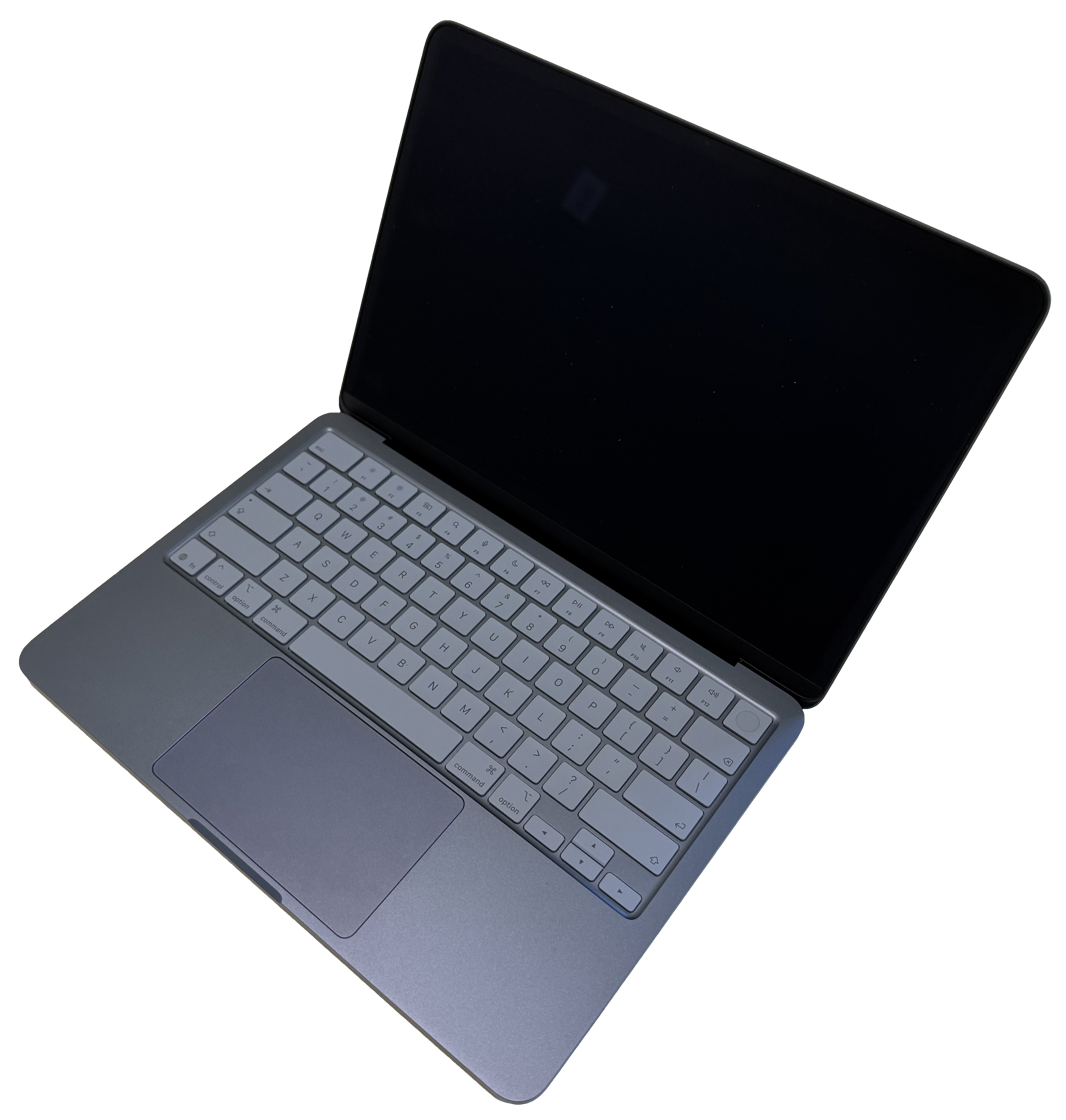
The MacBook Neo is the cheapest laptop Apple has ever sold, and the first publicly available Mac to use an A-series SoC.

In April 2018, Bloomberg reported Apple's plan to replace Intel chips with ARM processors similar to those in its phones, causing Intel's shares to drop by 9.2%. The Verge commented on the rumors, that such a decision made sense, as Intel was failing to make significant improvements to its processors, and could not compete with ARM chips on battery life.

At WWDC 2020, Tim Cook announced that the Mac would be transitioning to Apple silicon chips, built upon an ARM architecture, over a two-year timeline. The Rosetta 2 translation layer was also introduced, enabling Apple silicon Macs to run Intel apps. On November 10, 2020, Apple announced their first system-on-a-chip designed for the Mac, the Apple M1, and a series of Macs that would ship with the M1: the MacBook Air, Mac Mini, and the 13-inch MacBook Pro. These new Macs received highly positive reviews, with reviewers highlighting significant improvements in battery life, performance, and heat management compared to previous generations.

The iMac Pro was discontinued on March 6, 2021. On April 20, 2021, a new 24-inch iMac was revealed, featuring the M1 chip, seven new colors, thinner white bezels, a higher-resolution 1080p webcam, and an enclosure made entirely from recycled aluminum.

On October 18, 2021, Apple announced new 14-inch and 16-inch MacBook Pros, featuring the more powerful M1 Pro and M1 Max chips, a bezel-less mini-LED 120 Hz ProMotion display, and the return of MagSafe and HDMI ports, and the SD card slot.

On March 8, 2022, the Mac Studio was unveiled, also featuring the M1 Max chip and the new M1 Ultra chip in a similar form factor to the Mac Mini. It drew highly positive reviews for its flexibility and wide range of available ports. Its performance was deemed "impressive", beating the highest-end Mac Pro with a 28-core Intel Xeon chip, while being significantly more power efficient and compact. It was introduced alongside the Studio Display, meant to replace the 27-inch iMac, which was discontinued on the same day.

At WWDC 2022, Apple announced an updated MacBook Air based on a new M2 chip. It incorporates several changes from the 14-inch MacBook Pro, such as a flat, slab-shaped design, full-sized function keys, MagSafe charging, and a Liquid Retina display, with rounded corners and a display cutout incorporating a 1080p webcam.

The Mac Studio with M2 Max and M2 Ultra chips and the Mac Pro with M2 Ultra chip were unveiled at WWDC 2023, and the Intel-based Mac Pro was discontinued on the same day, completing the Mac transition to Apple silicon chips. The Mac Studio was received positively as a modest upgrade over the previous generation, albeit similarly priced PCs could be equipped with faster GPUs. However, the Apple silicon-based Mac Pro was criticized for several regressions, including memory capacity and a complete lack of CPU or GPU expansion options. A 15-inch MacBook Air was also introduced, and is the largest display included on a consumer-level Apple laptop.

The MacBook Pro was updated on October 30, 2023, with updated M3 Pro and M3 Max chips using a 3 nm process node, as well as the standard M3 chip in a refreshed iMac and a new base model MacBook Pro. Reviewers lamented the base memory configuration of 8 GB on the standard M3 MacBook Pro. In March 2024, the MacBook Air was also updated to include the M3 chip. In October 2024, several Macs were announced with the M4 series of chips, including the iMac, a redesigned Mac Mini, and the MacBook Pro; all of which included 16 GB of memory as standard. The MacBook Air was also upgraded with 16 GB for the same price.

In March 2026, Apple launched several MacBooks, with M5 series chips for the MacBook Air and higher-end MacBook Pros, as well as the MacBook Neo, a new entry-level model aimed at students and new Mac users. The MacBook Neo is the first Mac to use an A-series chip rather than the M-series chips found on other models. Due to its lower price, the Neo omits several features included on the MacBook Air and MacBook Pro, such as a Force Touch trackpad, a backlit keyboard and MagSafe charging. Later in March, Apple discontinued the Mac Pro, leaving the Mac Studio as the high-end desktop Mac.

The Mac Studio was updated on August 25, 2026, with the M5 Max and M5 Ultra chips. At the same time, the Mac Mini was announced with the Apple M6 and M5 Pro chips; the M6 uses a 2 nm process and a dual Neural Engine. On October 27, 2026, Apple updated the iMac and base model 14-inch MacBook Pro with the M6 chip. On October 28, the higher-end 14- and 16-inch models of the MacBook Pro were introduced with the M5 Pro and M5 Max chips, alongside a PROLED XDR display, the Dynamic Island (replacing the notch), and support for a touchscreen.

== Current Mac models ==
Mac models currently in production
Release date	Model	Processor	Form factor
March 11, 2026	MacBook Neo	Apple A18 Pro	Ultraportable laptop
March 11, 2026	MacBook Air (13-inch, M5)	Apple M5	Ultraportable laptop
March 11, 2026	MacBook Air (15-inch, M5)	Apple M5	Ultraportable laptop
March 11, 2026	MacBook Pro (14-inch, M5 Pro or M5 Max)	Apple M5 Pro or M5 Max	Workstation laptop
March 11, 2026	MacBook Pro (16-inch, M5 Pro or M5 Max)	Apple M5 Pro or M5 Max	Workstation laptop
September 22, 2026	Mac Mini (M6 or M5 Pro)	Apple M6 or M5 Pro	Small form factor desktop
September 22, 2026	Mac Studio (M5 Max or M5 Ultra)	Apple M5 Max or M5 Ultra	Workstation desktop
November 6, 2026	iMac (24-inch, M6)	Apple M6	All-in-one desktop
November 6, 2026	MacBook Pro (14-inch, M6)	Apple M6	Workstation laptop
November 6, 2026	MacBook Pro (14-inch PROLED XDR)	Apple M5 Pro or M5 Max	Workstation laptop
November 6, 2026	MacBook Pro (16-inch PROLED XDR)	Apple M5 Pro or M5 Max	Workstation laptop

== Marketing ==
The "1984" advertisement debuted during Super Bowl XVIII.

The original Macintosh was marketed at Super Bowl XVIII with the highly acclaimed "1984" ad, directed by Ridley Scott. The ad alluded to George Orwell's novel Nineteen Eighty-Four, and symbolized Apple's desire to "rescue" humanity from the conformity of computer industry giant IBM. The ad is now considered a "watershed event" and a "masterpiece". Before the Macintosh, high-tech marketing catered to industry insiders rather than consumers, so journalists covered technology like the "steel or automobiles" industries, with articles written for a highly technical audience. The Macintosh launch event pioneered event marketing techniques that have since become "widely emulated" in Silicon Valley, by creating a mystique about the product and giving an inside look into its creation. Apple took a new "multiple exclusives" approach regarding the press, giving "over one hundred interviews to journalists that lasted over six hours apiece", and introduced a new "Test Drive a Macintosh" campaign.

Apple's brand, which established a "heartfelt connection with consumers", is cited as one of the keys to the Mac's success. After Steve Jobs's return to the company, he launched the Think different ad campaign, positioning the Mac as the best computer for "creative people who believe that one person can change the world". The campaign featured black-and-white photographs of luminaries like Albert Einstein, Gandhi, and Martin Luther King Jr., with Jobs saying: "if they ever used a computer, it would have been a Mac". The ad campaign was critically acclaimed and won several awards, including a Primetime Emmy. In the 2000s, Apple continued to use successful marketing campaigns to promote the Mac line, including the Switch and Get a Mac campaigns.

Apple's design paradigm has helped establish the Mac as a luxury brand. Apple has made product placements in film and television, for example like Mission: Impossible, Legally Blonde, and Sex and the City. Apple does not allow producers to show villains using Apple products. Its original shows produced for Apple TV+ feature prominent use of MacBooks.

The Mac is known for its highly loyal customer base. In the 2025 American Customer Satisfaction Index, Apple scored 82 out of 100 among personal-computer manufacturers, down from 85 in 2024 and one point behind HP. According to Gartner, Apple remained the fourth-largest personal-computer vendor in 2025, shipping an estimated 24.8 million Macs for a 9.2% worldwide market share, an increase of 10.3% in shipments from 2024. In the first quarter of 2026, Gartner estimated that Apple shipped 6.7 million Macs, increasing its market share to 10.6%; its 12.7% year-over-year shipment growth was the highest among the major vendors and was attributed primarily to demand for the MacBook Neo. Apple reported $33.7 billion in Mac net sales for its 2025 fiscal year, a 12% increase from 2024.

== Hardware ==
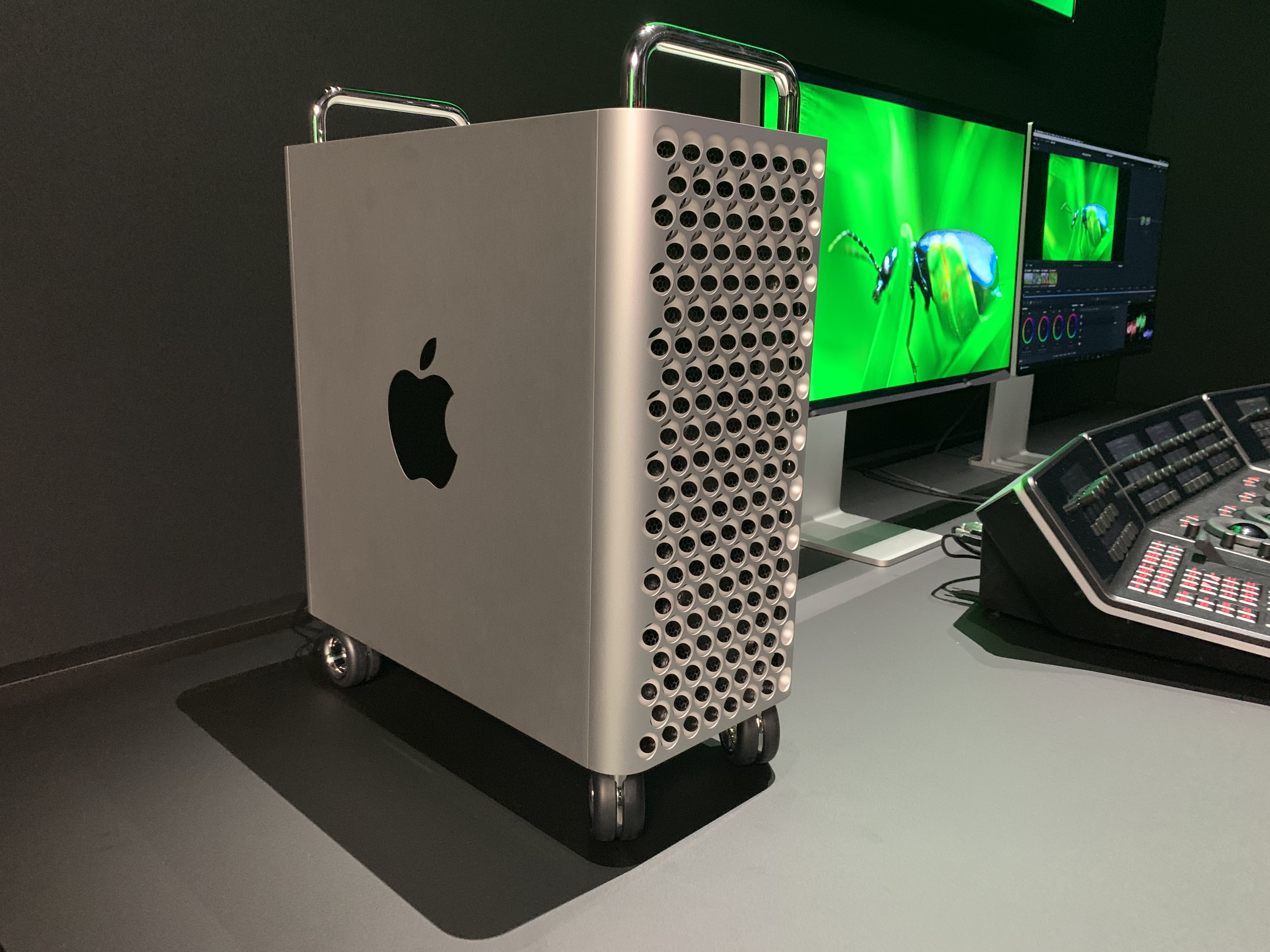
A Mac Pro from 2019 being used for color grading

Apple outsources the production of its hardware to manufacturers such as Foxconn and Pegatron, with most assembly historically taking place in Asia. In February 2026, Apple announced that it would begin producing Mac minis at an expanded manufacturing site in Houston, Texas, later that year, while continuing large-scale production in Asia. As a vertically integrated company developing its own operating system and chips, it has control over all aspects of its products and integration between hardware and software.

All Macs in production use ARM-based Apple silicon processors and have been praised for their performance and power efficiency. They can run Intel apps through the Rosetta 2 translation layer, and iOS and iPadOS apps distributed via the App Store. They can also run ARM-based virtual machines (including Windows on Arm) using hypervisor software such as VMware Fusion or Parallels Desktop. Depending on the model, current Macs provide USB4 and Thunderbolt 4 or Thunderbolt 5 connectivity; supported Thunderbolt 5 models reach transfer rates of up to 120 Gbit/s. Apple silicon Macs have custom integrated graphics rather than graphics cards. MacBooks are recharged with either USB-C or MagSafe connectors, depending on the model.

Apple sells accessories for the Mac, including the Studio Display and Pro Display XDR external monitors, the AirPods line of wireless headphones, and keyboards and mice such as the Magic Keyboard, Magic Trackpad, and Magic Mouse.

== Software ==
The latest release of macOS, Golden Gate 27, was released in 2026.

Macs run the macOS operating system, which is the second most widely used desktop OS according to StatCounter. Macs can also run Windows, Linux, or other operating systems through virtualization, emulation, or multi-booting.

macOS is the successor of the classic Mac OS, which had nine releases between 1984 and 1999. The last version of classic Mac OS, Mac OS 9, was introduced in 1999. Mac OS 9 was succeeded by Mac OS X in 2001. Over the years, Mac OS X was rebranded first to OS X and later to macOS.

macOS is a derivative of NextSTEP and FreeBSD. It uses the XNU kernel, and the core of macOS has been open-sourced as the Darwin operating system. macOS features the Aqua user interface, the Cocoa set of frameworks, and the Objective-C and Swift programming languages. Macs are deeply integrated with other Apple devices, including the iPhone and iPad, through Continuity features like Handoff, Sidecar, Universal Control, and Universal Clipboard.

The first version of Mac OS X, version 10.0, was released in March 2001. Subsequent releases introduced major changes and features to the operating system. Mac OS X 10.4 Tiger added Spotlight search; 10.6 Snow Leopard brought refinements, stability, and full 64-bit support; 10.7 Lion introduced many iPad-inspired features; 10.10 Yosemite introduced a complete user interface revamp, replacing skeuomorphic designs with iOS 7-esque flat designs; 10.12 Sierra added the Siri voice assistant and Apple File System (APFS) support; 10.14 Mojave added a dark user interface mode; 10.15 Catalina dropped support for 32-bit apps; 11 Big Sur introduced an iOS-inspired redesign of the user interface, 12 Monterey added the Shortcuts app, Low Power Mode, and AirPlay to Mac; and 13 Ventura added Stage Manager, Continuity Camera, and passkeys.

The Mac has a variety of apps, including cross-platform apps like Google Chrome, Microsoft Office, Adobe Creative Cloud, Mathematica, Visual Studio Code, Ableton Live, and Cinema 4D. Apple has also developed several apps for the Mac, including Final Cut Pro, Logic Pro, iWork, GarageBand, and iMovie. Many open-source software applications run natively on macOS, such as LibreOffice, VLC, and GIMP, and command-line programs, which can be installed through MacPorts and Homebrew. Many applications for Linux or BSD also run on macOS, often using X11. Apple's official integrated development environment (IDE) is Xcode, allowing developers to create apps for the Mac and other Apple platforms.

As of September 2026, the latest release of macOS is macOS 27 Golden Gate. It is the first macOS release to support only Apple silicon Macs, ending major-version support for Intel-based models.

== Timeline ==
Timeline of Mac model families
See also: Timeline of the Apple II series, List of Mac models, and List of Apple products

Source: Glen Sanford, Apple History, apple-history.com
