= Primetime Emmy Award for Outstanding Commercial =

Emmy award for advertisements

- Awarded for: Outstanding Commercial
- Country: United States
- Presented by: Academy of Television Arts & Sciences
- Currently held by: "I'm Not Remarkable", (Apple) (2026)
- Website: emmys.com

The Primetime Emmy Award for Outstanding Commercial is awarded to one advertisement each year.

In the following list, the first titles listed in gold are the winners; those not in gold are nominees, which are listed in alphabetical order. The years given are those in which the ceremonies took place:

== Winners and nominations ==
=== 1990s ===
Year	Title	Brand	Nominees
1997 (49th)
1997 (49th)	"Chimps"	HBO	BBDO, Ad Agency; Pytka, Production Company
1997 (49th)	"Appliances"	GM EV-1	Hal Riney & Partners, Ad Agency; Industrial Light & Magic, Production Company
1997 (49th)	"Doctor"	Levi's	Foote, Cone & Belding, Ad Agency; Satellite, Production Company
1997 (49th)	"Elevator Fantasy"	Levi's	Foote, Cone & Belding, Ad Agency; Propaganda Films, Production Company
1997 (49th)	"Hello World"	Nike	Wieden+Kennedy, Ad Agency; Joint Films, Production Company
1998 (50th)
1998 (50th)	"Think Different"	Apple Computer	TBWA\Chiat\Day, Ad Agency
1998 (50th)	"The Elopement"	Pella Windows	Young & Rubicam, Ad Agency; Coppos Films, Production Company
1998 (50th)	"Freshman"	AT&T	Young & Rubicam, Ad Agency; Gartner, Production Company
1998 (50th)	"Virtual Reality"	American Express	Ogilvy & Mather, Ad Agency; Propaganda Films, Production Company
1998 (50th)	"Working Mother"	Hallmark	Leo Burnett Co., Ad Agency; Lieberman Productions, Production Company
1999 (51st)
1999 (51st)	"New Friend"	snap.com	NBC On-Air Promotions, Ad Agency; Gartner, Production Company
1999 (51st)	"Dances with Dog"	Miller Lite	Fallon McElligott, Ad Agency; @radical.media, Production Company
1999 (51st)	"Feet"	FoxSports.com	Cliff Freeman & Partners, Ad Agency; MJZ, Production Company
1999 (51st)	"Synchronicity"	Volkswagen	Arnold Communications, Ad Agency; HSI Productions, Production Company
1999 (51st)	"Tow Truck"	Discover Brokerage	Black Rocket, Ad Agency; Tool of North America, Production Company

=== 2000s ===
Year	Title	Brand	Nominees
2000 (52nd)
2000 (52nd)	"The Morning After"	Nike	Wieden+Kennedy, Ad Agency; Propaganda/Satellite, Production Company
2000 (52nd)	"Action Figures"	FedEx	BBDO New York, Ad Agency; Hungry Man Productions, Production Company
2000 (52nd)	"Cat Herders"	Electronic Data Systems	Fallon McElligott, Ad Agency; Hungry Man Productions, Production Company
2000 (52nd)	"Driving Range"	Nike	Wieden+Kennedy, Ad Agency; Propaganda/Satellite, Production Company
2000 (52nd)	"Whassup True"	Budweiser	DDB Chicago, Ad Agency; C&C Storm Films, Production Company
2001 (53rd)
2001 (53rd)	"Photo Booth"	PBS	Fallon Minneapolis, Ad Agency; @radical.media, inc., Production Company
2001 (53rd)	"Aaooga"	Mercedes-Benz USA	Merkley Newman Harty, Ad Agency; MJZ, Production Company
2001 (53rd)	"Freestyle"	Nike	Wieden+Kennedy, Ad Agency; RSA USA, Production Company
2001 (53rd)	"Light"	PBS	Fallon Minneapolis, Ad Agency; @radical.media, inc., Production Company
2001 (53rd)	"Modern Ark"	Mercedes-Benz USA	Merkley Newman Harty, Ad Agency; HSI Productions/Gerard de Thame Films, Production Company
2002 (54th)
2002 (54th)	"Move"	Nike	Wieden+Kennedy, Ad Agency; RSA USA, Production Company
2002 (54th)	"Amnesia"	Computer Associates BrightStor	Young & Rubicam, Ad Agency; @radical.media, inc., Production Company
2002 (54th)	"Broadway Tribute"	Visa	BBDO New York, Ad Agency; @radical.media, inc., Production Company
2002 (54th)	"First Words"	Disney	Leo Burnett Company, Ad Agency; Pytka Films, Production Company
2002 (54th)	"Nail Gun"	Fox Sports	TBWA\Chiat\Day, Ad Agency; Harvest Productions, Production Company
2002 (54th)	"Out of Towner"	Anheuser-Busch	DDB Chicago, Ad Agency; Hungry Man Productions, Production Company
2003 (55th)
2003 (55th)	"Fish"	PBS Promo	Fallon, Ad Agency; Independent Media, Production Company
2003 (55th)	"Angry Chicken"	Nike Footwear	Wieden+Kennedy, Ad Agency; Partizan, Production Company
2003 (55th)	"The Osbournes"	Pepsi Twist	BBDO New York, Ad Agency; Hungry Man Productions, Production Company
2003 (55th)	"Sheens"	Visa	BBDO New York, Ad Agency; Hungry Man Productions, Production Company
2003 (55th)	"Squares"	Volkswagen Beetle	Arnold Worldwide, Ad Agency; Anonymous Content, Production Company
2004 (56th)
2004 (56th)	"Outfit"	Citibank Identity Theft Card Protection	Fallon, Ad Agency; Thomas Thomas Films, Production Company
2004 (56th)	"Born a Donkey"	Budweiser	Goodby, Silverstein & Partners, Ad Agency; Biscuit Filmworks, Production Company
2004 (56th)	"Dominoes"	Miller	Young & Rubicam Chicago, Ad Agency; MJZ, Production Company
2004 (56th)	"Door Music"	Saturn	Goodby, Silverstein & Partners, Ad Agency; Anonymous Content, Production Company
2004 (56th)	"Interview"	United Airlines	Fallon, Ad Agency; ACME Filmworks, Production Company
2004 (56th)	"Rubberband Man"	Office Max	DDB Chicago, Ad Agency; Anonymous Content, Production Company
2005 (57th)
2005 (57th)	"Surprise Dinner"	Ameriquest Mortgage	DDB Los Angeles, Ad Agency; MJZ, Production Company
2005 (57th)	"Applause"	Budweiser	DDB Chicago, Ad Agency; PYTKA, Production Company
2005 (57th)	"Drink Up"	Aquafina	BBDO New York, Ad Agency; Traktor/Partisan, Production Company
2005 (57th)	"Glen"	Starbucks Doubleshot	Fallon New York, Ad Agency; Biscuit Filmworks, Production Company
2005 (57th)	"The One Campaign"	One.org	@radical.media, inc., Production Company
2006 (58th)
2006 (58th)	"Required Reading"	Hallmark	Leo Burnett Chicago, Ad Agency; The Institute for the Development of Enhanced Perceptual Awareness, Production Company
2006 (58th)	"Stick"	FedEx	BBDO New York, Ad Agency; Partizan, Production Company
2006 (58th)	"Concert"	Ameriquest Mortgage	DDB Los Angeles, Ad Agency; MJZ, Production Company
2006 (58th)	"Clydesdale American Dream"	Budweiser	DDB Chicago, Ad Agency; PYTKA, Production Company
2007 (59th)
2007 (59th)	"Animals"	American Express	Ogilvy & Mather, Ad Agency; Hungry Man, Production Company
2007 (59th)	"Battle"	Cingular	BBDO New York, Ad Agency; Park Pictures, Production Company
2007 (59th)	"Happiness Factory"	Coca-Cola	Wieden+Kennedy Amsterdam, Ad Agency; Psyop, Production Company
2007 (59th)	"Jar"	GE	BBDO New York, Ad Agency; Partizan Entertainment, Production Company
2007 (59th)	"Pinball"	Pepsi	BBDO New York, Ad Agency; Partizan Entertainment, Production Company
2007 (59th)	"Singing Cowboy"	Truth	Arnold / Crispin Porter + Bogusky, Ad Agency; MJZ, Production Company
2007 (59th)	"Snowball"	Travelers	Fallon, Ad Agency; MJZ, Production Company
2008 (60th)
2008 (60th)	"Swear Jar"	Bud Light	DDB Chicago, Ad Agency; Hungry Man, Production Company
2008 (60th)	"Brother of the Bride"	Hallmark	Leo Burnett, Ad Agency; PYTKA, Production Company
2008 (60th)	"Carrier Pigeons"	FedEx	BBDO New York, Ad Agency; MJZ, Production Company
2008 (60th)	"Delivery"	Travelers	Fallon, Ad Agency; MJZ, Production Company
2008 (60th)	"It's Mine"	Coca-Cola	Wieden+Kennedy, Ad Agency; MJZ, Production Company
2009 (61st)
2009 (61st)	"Heist"	Coca-Cola	Wieden+Kennedy, Ad Agency; Psyop, Production Company
2009 (61st)	"Airport Lounge"	American Express Platinum Card	Ogilvy & Mather, Ad Agency; Hungry Man, Production Company
2009 (61st)	"Alec in Hululand"	Hulu	Crispin Porter + Bogusky, Ad Agency
2009 (61st)	"Bottled Courage"	Nike	Wieden+Kennedy, Ad Agency; @radical.media, Production Company
2009 (61st)	"Circus"	Budweiser	DDB Chicago, Ad Agency; PYTKA, Production Company
2009 (61st)	"Magazine Buyer"	Bud Light	DDB Chicago, Ad Agency; Tool of North America, Production Company
2009 (61st)	"Tips"	CareerBuilder	MJZ, Production Company
2009 (61st)	"Wedding"	Sprint-Nextel	Goodby, Silverstein & Partners, Agency Agency; O Positive, Production Company

=== 2010s ===
Year	Title	Brand	Nominees
2010 (62nd)
2010 (62nd)	"The Man Your Man Could Smell Like"	Old Spice Body Wash	Wieden+Kennedy, Ad Agency; Smuggler, Production Company
2010 (62nd)	"Anthem"	Absolut	TBWA\Chiat\Day LA, Ad Agency; MJZ, Production Company
2010 (62nd)	"Coke Finals"	Coca-Cola	Wieden+Kennedy, Ad Agency; Epoch/Rattling Stick, Production Company
2010 (62nd)	"Game"	Snickers	BBDO New York, Ad Agency; MJZ, Production Company
2010 (62nd)	"Green Car"	Audi	Venables Bell & Partners, Ad Agency; Hungry Man, Production Company
2010 (62nd)	"Human Chain"	Nike	Wieden+Kennedy, Ad Agency; Park Pictures, Production Company
2011 (63rd)
2011 (63rd)	"Born of Fire"	Chrysler 200	Wieden+Kennedy, Ad Agency; Serial Pictures, Production Company
2011 (63rd)	"Baby"	McDonald's	TBWA\Chiat\Day LA, Ad Agency; MJZ, Production Company
2011 (63rd)	"Baby Driver"	Subaru	Carmichael Lynch, Ad Agency; RSA Films, Production Company
2011 (63rd)	"Conan"	American Express	Ogilvy & Mather New York, Ad Agency; Hungry Man, Production Company
2011 (63rd)	"Polar Bear"	Nissan LEAF	TBWA\Chiat\Day LA, Ad Agency; Epoch Films, Production Company
2011 (63rd)	"Questions"	Old Spice Body Wash	Wieden+Kennedy, Ad Agency; MJZ, Production Company
2012 (64th)
2012 (64th)	"Best Job"	Procter & Gamble	Wieden+Kennedy, Ad Agency; Anonymous Content, Production Company
2012 (64th)	"The Bark Side"	Volkswagen	Deutsch LA, Ad Agency; Caviar Films, Production Company
2012 (64th)	"Color Changes Everything"	Target	Wieden+Kennedy New York, Ad Agency; Smuggler, Production Company
2012 (64th)	"The Dog Strikes Back"	Volkswagen	Deutsch LA, Ad Agency; Park Pictures, Production Company
2012 (64th)	"It's Halftime in America"	Chrysler	Wieden+Kennedy, Ad Agency; Chelsea Pictures, Production Company
2013 (65th)
2013 (65th)	"Inspired"	Canon	Grey, Ad Agency; Hungry Man, Production Company
2013 (65th)	"The Chase"	Grey Poupon	Crispin Porter + Bogusky, Ad Agency; MJZ, Production Company
2013 (65th)	"Jess Time"	Google Chrome	Wieden+Kennedy, Ad Agency; Google Creative Lab, Production Company
2013 (65th)	"Jogger"	Nike	Wieden+Kennedy, Ad Agency; Park Pictures, Production Company
2014 (66th)
2014 (66th)	"Misunderstood"	Apple	TBWA\Media Arts Lab, Ad Agency; Park Pictures, Production Company
2014 (66th)	"Childlike Imagination"	General Electric	BBDO, Ad Agency; MJZ, Production Company
2014 (66th)	"Hero's Welcome"	Budweiser	Anomaly, Ad Agency; HSI Productions, Production Company
2014 (66th)	"Possibilities"	Nike	Wieden+Kennedy, Ad Agency; MJZ, Production Company
2014 (66th)	"Puppy Love"	Budweiser	Anomaly, Ad Agency; RSA, Production Company
2015 (67th)
2015 (67th)	"#LikeAGirl"	Always	Leo Burnett Worldwide, Ad Agency; Chelsea Pictures, Production Company
2015 (67th)	"Brady Bunch"	Snickers	BBDO New York, Ad Agency; O Positive, Production Company
2015 (67th)	"Dream On"	Adobe	Goodby, Silverstein & Partners, Ad Agency; eLevel Films/Goodby Silverstein & Partners, Production Company
2015 (67th)	"Lost Dog"	Budweiser	Anomaly, Ad Agency; RSA Films, Production Company
2015 (67th)	"Made in NY"	Gatorade	TBWA\Chiat\Day LA, Ad Agency; Smuggler, Production Company
2016 (68th)
2016 (68th)	"Love Has No Labels"	Ad Council	R/GA, Ad Agency; Persuade&Influence/Mindride, Production Company
2016 (68th)	"Dear Peyton"	Gatorade	TBWA\Chiat\Day LA, Ad Agency; Smuggler, Production Company
2016 (68th)	"Marilyn"	Snickers	BBDO New York, Ad Agency; O Positive, Production Company
2016 (68th)	"Paper"	Honda	RPA, Ad Agency; Reset Content, Production Company
2016 (68th)	"Year in Search 2015"	Google	72andSunny, Ad Agency; Hecho en 72, Production Company
2017 (69th)
2017 (69th)	"Calling JohnMalkovich.com"	Squarespace	John X Hannes, Ad Agency; Smuggler, Production Company
2017 (69th)	"Love Cam"	Ad Council: Love Has No Labels	R/GA, Ad Agency; Tool of North America, Production Company
2017 (69th)	"We Are America"	Ad Council: Love Has No Labels	R/GA, Ad Agency; MJZ, Production Company
2017 (69th)	"Why I March"	Women's March on Washington	McGarryBowen, Ad Agency; Hungry Man Productions, Production Company
2017 (69th)	"Year in Search 2016"	Google	72andSunny, Ad Agency; Hecho en 72, Production Company
2018 (70th)
2018 (70th)	"The Talk"	P&G: My Black Is Beautiful	BBDO New York, Ad Agency; The Corner Shop, Production Company
2018 (70th)	"Alexa Loses Her Voice"	Amazon	Lucky Generals, Ad Agency; Hungry Man, Production Company
2018 (70th)	"Earth: Shot on iPhone"	iPhone	TBWA\Media Arts Lab, Ad Agency
2018 (70th)	"In Real Life"	Monica Lewinsky: Anti-Bullying	BBDO New York, Ad Agency; BBDO Studios, Production Company
2018 (70th)	"It's a Tide Ad"	Tide	Saatchi & Saatchi NY, Ad Agency; Rattling Stick, Production Company
2019 (71st)
2019 (71st)	"Dream Crazy"	Nike	Wieden+Kennedy, Ad Agency; Park Pictures, Production Company
2019 (71st)	"Behind the Mac: Make Something Wonderful"	MacBook	TBWA\Media Arts Lab, Ad Agency
2019 (71st)	"A Great Day in Hollywood"	Netflix	Kamp Grizzly, Ad Agency; Pretty Bird, Production Company
2019 (71st)	"Point of View"	Sandy Hook Promise	BBDO New York, Ad Agency; MJZ, Production Company
2019 (71st)	"Shot on iPhone XS: Don't Mess with Mother"	iPhone	TBWA\Media Arts Lab, Ad Agency; Camp4 Collective, Production Company

=== 2020s ===
Year	Title	Brand	Nominees
2020 (72nd)
2020 (72nd)	"Back-To-School Essentials"	Sandy Hook Promise	SMUGGLER, Production Company; TBWA\Media Arts Lab, Ad Agency
2020 (72nd)	"Before Alexa"	Amazon	Droga5 London, Ad Agency; Somesuch x Revolver/Will O'Rourke, Production Company
2020 (72nd)	"Bounce"	Apple AirPods	Pulse Films, Production Company; TBWA\Media Arts Lab, Ad Agency
2020 (72nd)	"Groundhog Day"	Jeep (FCA)	O Positive, Production Company; Highdive Advertising, Ad Agency
2020 (72nd)	"The Look"	P&G	Saturday Morning, Ad Agency; Stink Films, Production Company
2021 (73rd)
2021 (73rd)	"You Can't Stop Us"	Nike	Wieden+Kennedy, Ad Agency; Pulse, Production Company
2021 (73rd)	"Airpods Pro — Jump"	Apple AirPods	TBWA\Media Arts Lab, Ad Agency; Imperial Woodpecker, Production Company
2021 (73rd)	"Alexa's Body"	Amazon Alexa	Lucky Generals, Ad Agency; Hungry Man, Production Company
2021 (73rd)	"Better, Mamba Forever"	Nike	Wieden+Kennedy, Ad Agency; PRETTYBIRD, Production Company
2021 (73rd)	"It Already Does That"	Apple Watch Series 6	Apple, Ad Agency; MJZ, Production Company
2021 (73rd)	"You Love Me"	Beats by Dre	Translation, LLC, Ad Agency; PRETTYBIRD, Production Company
2022 (74th)
2022 (74th)	"Teenage Dream"	Sandy Hook Promise	BBDO New York, Ad Agency; Smuggler, Production Company
2022 (74th)	"Detectives"	Apple iPhone 13 Pro	Apple, Ad Agency; O Positive, Production Company
2022 (74th)	"Everyone but Jon Hamm"	Apple TV+	TBWA\Media Arts Lab, Ad Agency; Hungry Man Productions, Production Company
2022 (74th)	"The Lost Class"	Change the Ref	Leo Burnett Chicago, Ad Agency; Hungry Man Productions, Production Company
2022 (74th)	"Skate Nation Ghana"	Meta	Droga5, Ad Agency; Love Song, Production Company
2022 (74th)	"Walter the Cat"	Chevy Silverado	Commonwealth//McCann, Ad Agency; O Positive, Production Company
2023 (75th)
2023 (75th)	"The Greatest — Accessibility"	Apple	Apple Inc., Ad Agency; Somesuch, Production Company
2023 (75th)	"Call Me with Timothée Chalamet"	Apple TV+	TBWA\Media Arts Lab, Ad Agency; MJZ, Production Company
2023 (75th)	"Cost of Beauty"	Dove	Ogilvy, Ad Agency; Smuggler, Production Company
2023 (75th)	"Forever"	The Farmer's Dog	Sanctuary, Production Company
2023 (75th)	"R.I.P. Leon"	Apple	Apple Inc., Ad Agency; Biscuit Filmworks, Production Company
2023 (75th)	"The Singularity"	Squarespace	Squarespace, Ad Agency; Smuggler, Production Company
2023 (75th)	"Quiet the Noise"	AirPods	TBWA\Media Arts Lab, Ad Agency; Iconoclast TV, Production Company
2024 (76th)
2024 (76th)	"Fuzzy Feelings"	Apple - iPhone + Mac	TBWA\ Media Arts Lab, Ad Agency; Hungry Man, Production Company
2024 (76th)	"Album Cover"	Apple iPhone 15	Apple, Ad Agency; O Positive, Production Company
2024 (76th)	"Best Friends"	Uber One / Uber Eats	Mother, Ad Agency; O Positive, Production Company
2024 (76th)	"Just Joking"	Sandy Hook Promise	BBDO New York, Ad Agency; SMUGGLER, Production Company
2024 (76th)	"Like a Good Neighbaaa"	State Farm	Highdive, Ad Agency; O Positive, Production Company
2024 (76th)	"Michael CeraVe"	CeraVe Moisturizing Cream	Ogilvy PR, Ad Agency; Prettybird, Production Company
2025 (77th)
2025 (77th)	"Brian Cox Goes to College"	Uber One for Students	Special US, Ad Agency; O Positive, Production Company
2025 (77th)	"Batman vs. Bateman"	State Farm	Highdive, Ad Agency; Hungry Man, Production Company
2025 (77th)	"The Boy & the Octopus"	The Walt Disney Company	adam&eveDDB, Ad Agency; Hungry Man, Production Company
2025 (77th)	"Flock"	Apple Privacy	TBWA\Media Arts Lab, Ad Agency; Smuggler, Production Company
2025 (77th)	"Heartstrings"	Apple AirPods Pro	TBWA\Media Arts Lab, Ad Agency; Smuggler, Production Company
2025 (77th)	"So Win."	Nike	Wieden+Kennedy, Ad Agency; Somesuch, Production Company
2026 (78th)
2026 (78th)	"I'm Not Remarkable"	Apple	Apple, Ad Agency; Somesuch, Production Company
2026 (78th)	"Backstory"	Levi's	TBWA\Chiat\Day LA, Ad Agency; Somesuch Los Angeles, Production Company
2026 (78th)	"Backyard Legends"	adidas World Cup	Lola USA, Ad Agency; Smuggler, Production Company
2026 (78th)	"A Critter Carol"	Apple	TBWA Media Arts Lab, Ad Agency; Smuggler, Production Company
2026 (78th)	"Why Do It"	Nike	Wieden+Kennedy, Ad Agency; Iconoclast, Production Company
2026 (78th)	"Your Way Out"	Coinbase	Isle of Any, Ad Agency; MJZ, Production Company
