= Raine Allen-Miller =

British film director

- Born: September 1989 (age 36); Manchester, England
- Years active: 2014–present
- Spouse: Freddie Waters (m. 2023)
- Website: Official website

Raine Allen-Miller (born September 1989) is a British film director and writer. She is known for her debut feature film Rye Lane (2023).

== Early life ==
Born in Manchester, Allen-Miller spent her early childhood in Moss Side. She has two younger sisters and a younger brother. Her mother worked in prisons teaching art and created centres to support pupils excluded from schools. Her mother would frequently take her to Blockbuster, which fueled her love for films.

When she was 12 years old, Allen-Miller moved to Brixton, South London, with her father. Upon arriving in London, Allen-Miller's grandmother took her to Brixton Market to connect with her heritage and get "Jamaican spice or plantain or an Afro comb". Allen-Miller would put on one-man shows as a child, recreating the musical Annie for her family.

Allen-Miller attended the BRIT School in Croydon, where she studied art. She began her studies in Illustration at Camberwell College of Arts, but dropped out.

== Career ==
Allen-Miller worked as an agent for artists and photographers, and then in art-buying and creative production. She left her job to form a creative duo with school friend and copywriter Lisa Turner-Wray, submitting portfolios to agencies and landing their first advertising gig with Anomaly in October 2014. This was followed by further gigs with Saatchi & Saatchi and Mother.

She directed her first music video for Salute's "Storm" in the aftermath of the 2016 EU referendum and made it a celebration of immigration. This was followed by Denai Moore's "Trickle" in 2017 as well as Allen-Miller's first short film Jerk in 2018, about an older man from the Windrush generation. She also worked on campaigns for ASOS, the Tate Modern, and Squarespace, and on a workshop for the Creative Circle Foundation. She was named a 2021 Screen International Star of Tomorrow.

Despite having mixed feelings on the genre, Allen-Miller's first feature film Rye Lane (2023) is a romantic comedy drama set in Peckham, south London. The project came about through Jerk, where she met the BBC Film producer Eva Yates. Yates then recommended Allen-Miller to be the director for writers Nathan Bryon and Tom Melia's screenplay, originally set in Camden. According to Allen-Miller, in addition to its two lead characters, Dom (David Jonsson) and Livewire Yas (Vivian Oparah), the film's setting should also be considered a character. She called it "a love letter to South London".

"I know Peckham and Brixton so well that I had to shoot it there. I wanted to elevate these places and put them on a plinth. They have so much soul and depth. When we were filming, so many people came over and asked, 'You shooting EastEnders?’ They were so excited that we were there. That is one of the things I love about south London. You can be walking down Rye Lane and see someone carrying a trolley full of tins of beans with a dog just sitting there. It's that spirit."

The film opened at the 2023 Sundance Film Festival to critical acclaim. At the British Independent Film Awards 2023 the film was nominated for Best British Independent Film with Allen-Miller being nominated for Best Director. Actor Colin Firth has a cameo in the film. The film's production company Searchlight planned for a straight-to-streaming US release.

As of March 2023, Allen-Miller is writing another film and developing a television show. She has stated that she does not expect to return to the rom-com genre any time soon. She also has a heist film in development.

== Artistry ==
Allen-Miller considers British director Steve McQueen to be her "biggest hero", and also mentioned Swedish director Roy Andersson as an influence of hers. In 2017, she said, "I am really inspired by Jean-Paul Goude, Guy Bourdin and interior design throughout history. Art department is something I find really interesting because I think you can tell a story with an environment." She considers Spike Lee and Martin Scorsese as prominent influences, as well as the films Beverly Hills Cop and Pretty Woman.

For her debut feature film, Rye Lane, Allen-Miller wanted the female lead to be funny, and the world to feel more elevated and dreamlike. She pulled a reference from the Channel 4 sitcom Peep Show when framing wide shots close to actors' faces without breaking the fourth wall, which cinematographer Olan Collardy called the "Peep shot".

== Personal life ==
In December 2023, Allen-Miller married fellow filmmaker Freddie Waters at Lambeth Town Hall followed by a reception at the Camberwell Arms.
