= Harry Lees =

Harry Lees may refer to:

- Harry Lees (Australian footballer) (1890–1964), Australian rules footballer
- Harry Lees (English footballer) (1900–1966), English footballer

== See also ==
- Harry Leese (1886–?), English footballer
- Harry Lee (disambiguation)
