= Henry Lee =

Henry Lee may refer to:

== People ==
- Sir Henry Lee of Ditchley (1533–1611), Master of the Ordnance and Queen's Champion under Elizabeth I of England, MP for Buckinghamshire
- Henry Lee (Canterbury MP) (c. 1657–1734), MP for Canterbury
- Capt. Henry Lee I (1691–1747), of Lee Hall, Westmoreland County Virginia; Virginian colonist, grandfather of Henry Lee III
- Major General Henry Lee II (1730–1787), of Leesylvania, father of Henry "Light-Horse Harry" Lee III
- Major General Henry Lee III (1756–1818), nicknamed "Light-Horse Harry", Virginia governor and Congressman as well as early American officer
- Henry Lee IV (1787–1837), also known as "Black Horse Harry" Lee, half-brother of Robert E. Lee and son of Henry Lee III
- Henry Lee (economist) (1782–1867), proponent of free trade and candidate for Vice President of the United States in 1832
- Henry Lee (naturalist) (1826?–1888), English aquarium director and author
- Henry Lee (Australian politician) (1856–1927), Australian politician
- Henry A. G. Lee (c. 1818–1851), newspaper editor, politician, militia officer in Oregon, United States
- Henry B. Lee (1781–1817), U.S. Representative from New York
- Henry David Lee (1849–1928), American businessman
- Henry W. Lee (socialist) (1865–1932), British socialist
- Henry Lee (forensic scientist) (1938–2026), Chinese-American forensic scientist
- Henry Lee (Southampton MP) (1817–1904), British Member of Parliament for Southampton, 1880–1885
- Henry Lee Junior (born 1958), Hong Kong celebrity and racing driver
- Henry Lee (actor) (born 1949), Hong Kong TVB actor
- Henry W. Lee (bishop) (1815–1874), Episcopal bishop in America
- Henry Lee (cyclist) (1887–1980), British Olympic cyclist
- Henry Austin Lee (1847–1918), British diplomat, governor and landowner
- Henry Pelham Lee (1877–1953), English engine pioneer
- Henry Lee (surgeon) (1817–1898), British surgeon, pathologist and syphilologist
- Henry Lee Lucas (1936–2001), American criminal, convicted of murder and once listed as America's most prolific serial killer

== Music ==
- "Henry Lee", an alternate title of "Young Hunting", a traditional murder ballad originating in Scotland.

== See also ==
- Harry Lee (disambiguation)
- Henry Ley (disambiguation)
