= Harry Lee =

Harry Lee may refer to:

== Sports ==
- Harry Lee (cricketer) (1890–1981), English cricketer
- Harry Lee (tennis) (1907–1998), British tennis player
- Harry Lee (athlete) (1877–1937), American track and field athlete
- Harry Lee (footballer, born 1887) (1887–?), English football forward
- Harry Lee (footballer, born 1933), English footballer
- Harry Lee (footballer, born 1995), English footballer
- Harry Lee (footballer, born 2004), English footballer
- Harry Lee (Canadian football) (1932–2019), Canadian football player
- Harry Lee (rugby union), English international rugby union player

== Military ==
- Harry Lee (United States Marine) (1872–1935), US Marine Corps General and military governor of Santo Domingo
- Henry Lee III (1756–1818), Revolutionary War general and Congressman, nicknamed "Light Horse Harry"

== Others ==
- Harry Lee Kuan Yew (1923–2015), first Prime Minister of Singapore
- Harry David Lee (1849–1928), American businessman
- Harry Lee (sheriff) (1932–2007), Chinese-American sheriff of Jefferson Parish, Louisiana
- Harry W. Lee (1865–1932), British socialist activist
- Harry Lee (shell collector) (died 2024), American shell collector

== See also ==
- Henry Lee (disambiguation)
- Harold Lee (disambiguation)
- Harry Leigh (1888–?), British footballer
