= Cat Herders =

2000 Super bowl advertisement

Cat Herders is a commercial made by Fallon for Electronic Data Systems (EDS). Alluding to the management-speak idiom "It's like herding cats" that refers to the impossibility of controlling the uncontrollable, it posits an analogy between herding cats and the solution of seemingly impossible problems by EDS.

Using a "giant Western metaphor", it features "grizzled cowboys" herding thousands of cats across the Montana prairie, terminating in the satisfactory resolution "EDSolved". The commercial was broadcast on ABC on 30 January 2000 during ABC's coverage of Super Bowl XXXIV. and was cited by then-President Bill Clinton as his favorite commercial.

== Title and Cat Herders campaign ==
EDS retained Fallon in 1999 to create a campaign with strong brand awareness with a dual purpose: to change the company's image for present and future growth and also to improve the morale and self-image of its employees. Fulfilling this remit, the advertisement "gave EDS employees an image that was serious, despite the humor of the commercial, and it highlighted EDS’s problem-solving capabilities for its customers."

The title "Cat Herders" applied to both the initial advertisement and the campaign, which was presented as a trilogy. The two sequels, "Airplane" and "Running with Squirrels", had visual impact but did not replicate the success of "Cat Herders".

== Cast ==
Authentic cowboys were required, and a casting call was put out across Arizona, New Mexico, Colorado and California. Some of the cast had never acted previously but others were SAG-accredited.

Actor Tony Becker points out that many of the actors were "real-life cowboys", and gives a comprehensive cast list:

=== Actors/cowboys ===
- Steven Lane
- Tony Becker
- Mark Brooks
- Tim Carroll
- David Cleveland
- Jeremy Cluff
- Walter Doran
- Jake Sanders
- Kent Wakefield Smith
- Susan Smith
- Gene McLaughlin
- Clif Stokes
- David Jean Thomas
- R. J. Chambers - Stunts
- Brian Burrows -Stunts

Notwithstanding the listing of only two participants as stunt performers, many of the actors are skilled cowboy professionals, with credits as horse trainers, wranglers, doubles, trick-roper and also as stunt performers. A few operate ranches or rodeo or stunt performing services, as per the citations given above.

For the shoot, some actors wore their own clothes, but their faces were made up to look cat-scratched, tanned or weatherbeaten.

=== Cats ===
Numbers of cats used to create the illusion of thousands running wild vary from 50 to 60. According to Becker, "only about 60 cats were used in the actual filming (with about 1 trainer per 5 cats). The rest were computer-generated".

== Filming ==
=== Location and conditions ===
Cat Herders was filmed during December 1999 at Tejon Ranch, about 70 miles north of Los Angeles. Established in 1843, it is, at nearly 270,000 acres, the largest continuous expanse of private land in California. The landscape features a "dramatic tapestry of rugged mountains, steep canyons, oak-covered rolling hills, and broad valleys" and cowboys on horseback still herd cattle along the open grazing land.

Filming was accomplished over five days of wintry conditions, workers in goggles and full face masks battling through rain, snow, fog, sleet, blowing sand and fierce 40mph winds. As one worker recalls: "Shooting this spot was the most cold and miserable shooting days I've ever had. Out in the plains, freezing cold, wind so strong it would catch your car door and bend it back." On set, the cats were housed in individual cages in "trucks filled with movie cats". At night, "interspecies bonding" occurred with crew members bringing cats back to their hotels:

"we actually snuck a cat into our motel room because he had had surgery and needed to recuperate. So he lived under the bed".

=== Script ===
The copywriter was Greg Hahn, but "the script came largely out of the improvised quips of the cowboys, replacing cattle with cats".

=== Cat training and filming ===
The commercial called for differing feline skills, including running, water scenes, or staying motionless. To prepare for filming, 50 cats and their trainers travelled to Tejon Ranch a week before the crew.

For the dramatic river-crossing, Art Director Dean Hanson told Adweek,

Trainers taught the cats to swim by starting them out in one-quarter inch of water, then gradually building the pool to swimming depth. . . . Since we were shooting in nippy weather, our 'river' was actually a small pool warmed by a portable heater, like a little cat Jacuzzi.

Cats worked in shifts to film the herding scenes, with head trainer Karin McElhatton hiding in tumbleweeds to issue verbal directions.

The illusion of cats stampeding was achieved by using clickers normally associated with food. During filming, clickers prompted the felines to run downhill, towards food which was out of shot. At other times, cats were lured by "strategically smeared tuna".

=== Animal welfare ===
Monitored by the American Humane Association, horses and cats were filmed separately in order to prevent "accidental tramplings".

For scenes where both are required, a computer-operated motion-control camera is used to film the same shot over and over with each animal. The horses, background and layers of kitties are filmed separately, and each will be stripped in during post-production to create the illusion of an elaborate cat drive.

== Agency and creative credits ==
- For the Fallon agency, Minneapolis, David Lubars (Creative Director), Dean Hanson (Art Director), Greg Hahn (Copywriter), Judy Brink (Executive Producer) and Marty Wetherall (Agency Producer).
- Agency Producer and Agency Visual Effects Supervisor: Bob Wendt
- The film company was Hungry Man. Director John O'Hagan worked with producer JD Davison.
- CGI: Sight Effects, Venice, California.
- Editor: Gordon Carey for FilmCore
- Music: Asche & Spencer, Minneapolis
- Sound and music mixing: Margarita Mix, Santa Monica, under the direction of chief engineer Jimmy Hite
- Sound Design: Framework Sound, Burbank

== Awards and accolades ==
Among others, Cat Herders won the First Boards Award (2000), a Cannes Silver Lion (2000), a bronze Clio (2001), Advertising Age’s Best Visual Effects Award (2001), and a silver EFFIE Award (2001).

It received a nomination for an Emmy for Outstanding Commercial (2000).
