= Nassarius harryleei =

Scientific classification
- Kingdom: Animalia
- Phylum: Mollusca
- Class: Gastropoda
- Subclass: Caenogastropoda
- Order: Neogastropoda
- Family: Nassariidae
- Genus: Nassarius
- Species: N. harryleei

Binomial name
- Nassarius harryleei Garcia E., 2001

Species of gastropod

Nassarius harryleei is a species of sea snail, a marine gastropod mollusc in the family Nassariidae, the Nassa mud snails or dog whelks. It is named for shell collector Harry Lee.

== Description ==
The shell grows to a length of 4 mm.

== Distribution ==
This marine species occurs in the Pacific Ocean off Panama.
