= Helly Hansen =

Norwegian textile company

Helly Hansen AS
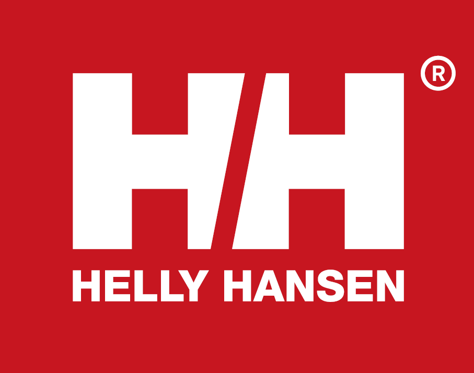
- Type: Subsidiary
- Industry: Clothing; Survival and rescue gear Fishing equipment
- Founded: 1877
- Founder: Helly Juell Hansen; Maren Margrethe
- Headquarters: Oslo, Norway
- Area served: Worldwide
- Key people: Carrie Ask (CEO)
- Products: Industrial workwear Outerwear; Street wear Survival and rescue gear Fishing equipment
- Revenue: $491 million (2019)
- Number of employees: ~750
- Parent: The Hansen Family (1877–1984); Orkla Group (1984–1995) (100%), (1995–1997) (50%); Resource Group International (1995–1997) (50%); Investcorp (1997–2006); Altor Equity Partners (2006–2012); Ontario Teachers' Pension Plan (2012–2018); Canadian Tire (2018–2025); Kontoor Brands (2025–present)
- Website: www.hellyhansen.com

Helly Hansen AS is a Norwegian manufacturer and retailer of clothing and sports equipment. Currently headquartered in Oslo, it was previously headquartered in Moss, Norway, from its founding in 1877 until October 2009. It is a wholly-owned subsidiary of Kontoor Brands.

== History ==
Helly Juell Hansen had been at sea since the age of 14. In 1877 at the age of 35, he and his wife Maren Margarethe produced their first oilskin jackets, trousers, sou'westers and tarpaulins made from coarse linen soaked in linseed oil. Over the first five years they sold around 10,000 pieces.

In 1878, the company won a diploma for excellence at the Paris Expo, and began exporting its products.

After Helly Juell Hansen's death in 1914, company leadership passed on to his son Leiv Helly-Hansen, an experienced merchant.

In the 1920s, a new fabric, which Helly Hansen called Linox, was developed. Over the next 30 years the name Linox would transfer to a PVC (polyvinyl chloride) application.

A change for the brand came in 1949 when Helox was developed. The sheet of translucent PVC plastic sewn into waterproof coats and hats became a popular item. About 30,000 Helox coats were produced each month. Plarex, a heavier-duty version of Helox, backed by fabric, was developed for workwear.

Fibrepile, which is an insulation layer for wearing under waterproofs, was developed for the outdoor and workwear markets. It was used by Swedish lumbermen, who discovered that it offered insulation against the cold, and ventilated well during hard, physical work in the forest.

The layering story was completed in the 1970s, with the development of LIFA. The polypropylene fibre used in LIFA kept the skin dry and warm by pushing moisture away from the body, making it the ideal base-layer fabric for outdoor and workwear use. It was the birth of the three-layer systems of dress with LIFA close to the body, Fibrepile as an insulation layer, and rainwear for protection.

During the 1970s, the company developed survival suits for offshore oil workers in the North Sea. In 1980 the company's breathable, waterproof fabric system, called Helly Tech, was launched. Helly Tech garments use both hydrophilic and microporous technology. Hydrophilic garments have water-loving molecular chains which pass water vapor to the outside. Microporous garments have tiny pores that allow water vapor to pass out of the fabric without letting rain droplets in.

Helly Hansen clothing developed a following among urban youth in the late 1990s, particularly in North England and with the hip hop culture in the US. The brand developed a mass appeal and is now sold in sports shops, not only the hiking and specialized clothing shops of before.

In 2008, they launched Odin, a 3-Layer materialization system made for mountaineers. The Odin collection won the Red Dot Design Award the same year.

In 2012, Helly Hansen introduced their H2 Flow Technology with the H2 Flow Jacket. The H2 Flow Jacket allows the wearer to regulate their body temperature.

== Corporate history ==
By 1995, the company was owned by Norwegian conglomerate Orkla. That year, Orkla sold a 50% stake in Helly Hansen to Resource Group International, which merged with Aker in 1996.

In 1997, Investcorp bought Aker's stake and most of Orkla's stake, resulting in its 70% ownership of Helly Hansen, which was valued at $160 million at the time.

In October 2006, Investcorp sold its shares in Helly Hansen to Altor Equity Partners, a private equity firm.

In 2012, Altor sold a 75% stake in Helly Hansen to the Ontario Teachers' Pension Plan.

In 2015, the Ontario Teachers' Pension Plan increased its position, acquiring Altor's remaining stock in the business. In May 2018, Ontario Teachers sold the company to Canadian Tire for CA$985 million.

In February 2025, Kontoor Brands agreed to acquire Helly Hansen for $1.3 billion. The acquisition was completed in June 2025.

== Partnerships ==
In February 2011, a three-year partnership was announced with guiding company Mountain Madness to outfit all Mountain Madness operations guides "with technical apparel from head to toe" beginning the 2011 season and extending through 2013.

In November 2012, Helly Hansen partnered with the US Ski and Snowboard Association to be their official baselayer provider. The US Alpine Ski Team wore Helly Hansen baselayer while competing in Sochi.

Helly Hansen is the official apparel sponsor of the NOOD Regatta Races for sailing.

In July 2015, Helly Hansen became the apparel partner for Canada’s alpine and para-alpine ski teams.

In 2020, Helly Hansen partnered with The Ocean Race.

== Use by far-right groups ==
Helly Hansen clothing has been appropriated by neo-Nazi groups in Australia, due to the brand's "HH" logo, which extremists choose to interpret as an abbreviation for "Heil Hitler". Members of groups such as the now disbanded National Socialist Network have been observed wearing Helly Hansen jackets.
