= Pablo the Drug Mule Dog =

Character in a series of anti-cocaine television advertisements

Pablo the Drug Mule Dog

Pablo the Drug Mule Dog is the main character in a series of anti-cocaine television advertisements produced by the agency Mother for FRANK, the United Kingdom government's national anti-drug campaign. Pablo is rumoured to be named after Pablo Escobar, who was head of the Medellin cartel.

The main advertisement of the campaign begins with Pablo in a cellar with a large gash the length of his chest, from which bags of cocaine are being removed. From this point, Pablo to sets out to discover, "what's the big deal about coke?". He encounters an armed dealer before talking with a few pushers and users in a disco. The shot then moves to the inside of a toilet, where a young man's nostril starts to bleed. The advert ends with Pablo using a payphone to talk to Frank.

Pablo, voiced by David Mitchell, has a wry sense of humour and manages to satirise not only the cocaine trade but also the advert itself, through quotes like "I picked up the phone...somehow..and talked to Frank" and "Ever woken up with a huge gash in your stomach? I've had better mornings". Elements of recreational cocaine use are ridiculed in the campaign's six adverts, from bleeding nostrils being likened to an anus to sob-stories from pound notes used to snort the drug ("I hate being up his nostril!").

Indeed, the use of Pablo in the anti-drug campaign has been met with praise in the media and in the public eye, particularly for the large impact made without glamorising the drug trade. James Donaghy, writing for The Guardian said that "The Drug Mule Dog advert for the government's FRANK drugs helpline is a special kind of brilliant" and noted that "In a Home Office survey of [teenage audiences], 83% thought the FRANK adverts were very or fairly effective...surely some kind of miracle."
