= Wrangler (brand) =

American clothing manufacturer

- Formerly: Hudson Overall Company (1904–1947)
- Type: Division
- Industry: Clothing
- Founded: 1904; 122 years ago
- Founder: C.C. Hudson
- Headquarters: Greensboro, North Carolina, U.S.
- Area served: Worldwide
- Products: Jeans, shirts, shorts, eyeglasses
- Parent: Kontoor Brands (2019–present)
- Website: wrangler.com

Wrangler is an American manufacturer of jeans and other clothing items, particularly workwear. The brand is owned by Kontoor Brands, which also owns Lee. Its headquarters is in downtown Greensboro, North Carolina, with production plants located throughout the world.

== History ==
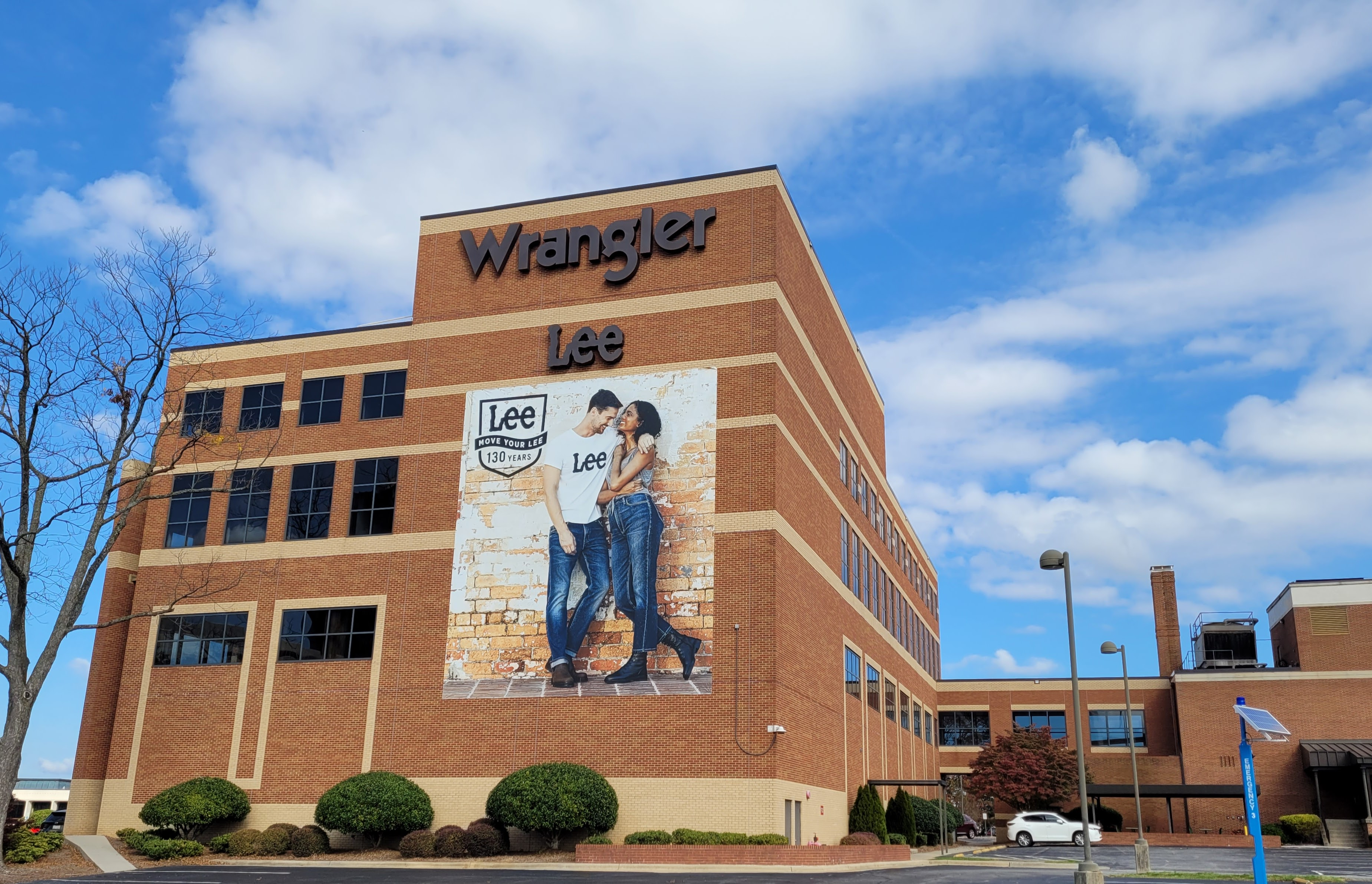
Wrangler headquarters in Greensboro, North Carolina, in 2022

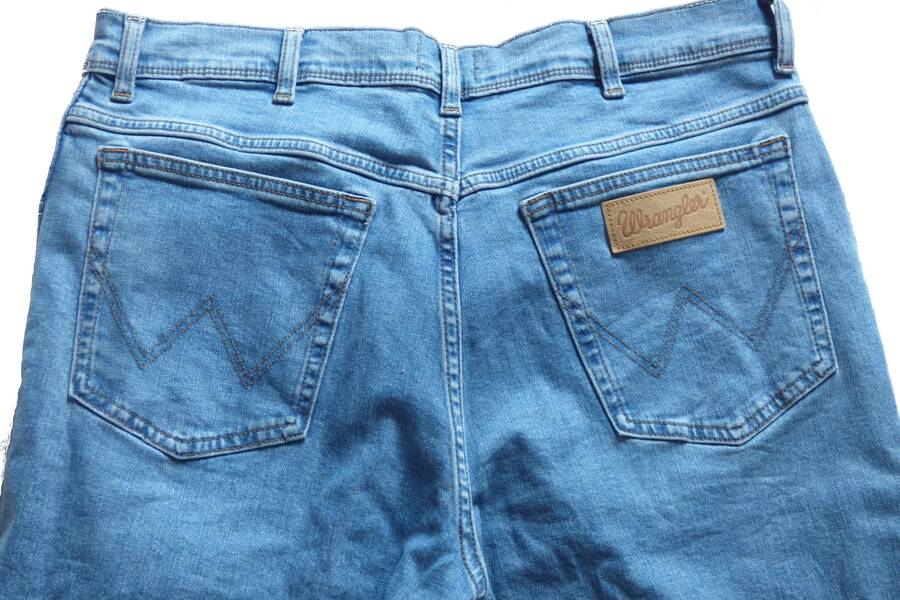
Back side of Wrangler jeans with letter W on each pocket and the brand name on the right pocket

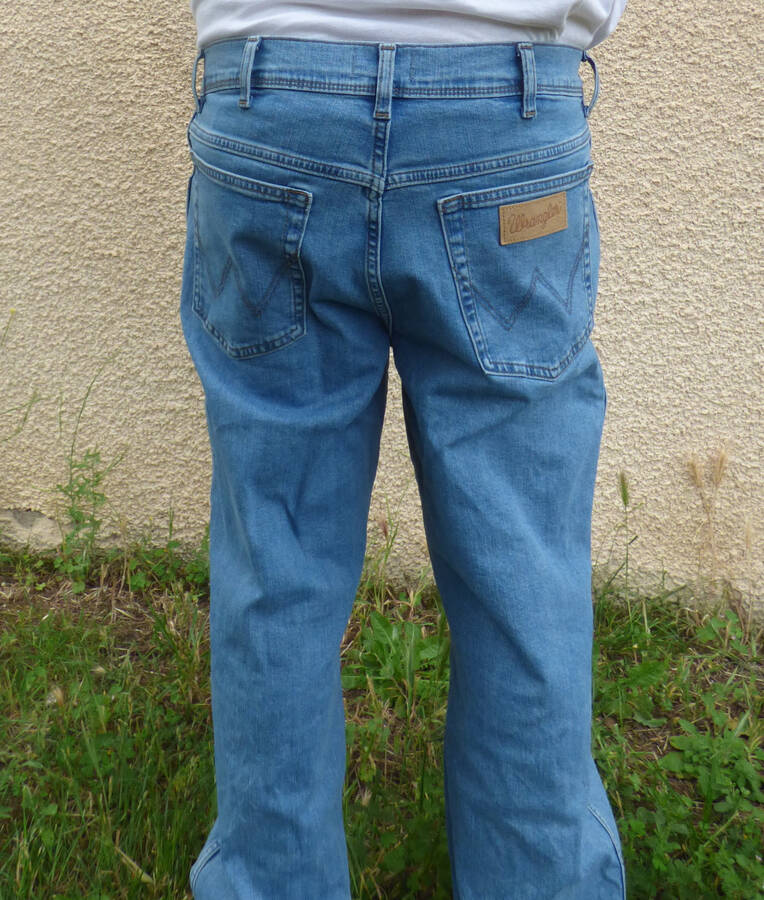
French man wearing Wrangler jeans

Wrangler Jeans were first made by the Blue Bell Overall Company, which had acquired the brand when it took over Casey Jones in the mid-1940s. Blue Bell employed Bernard Lichtenstein ("Rodeo Ben"), who worked closely with cowboys, to help design jeans suitable for rodeo use. He convinced several well-known rodeo riders of the time to endorse the new design.

The 13MWZ style, short for the thirteenth version of men's western jeans with zipper, was introduced in 1947. This model is still available and the company has since introduced several other lines that are more designated towards a specific group or demographic. Examples include 20X, Riggs, and Aura. Wrangler also exports its goods to many countries, with Europe and Australia being some of its main export markets.

=== Timeline ===
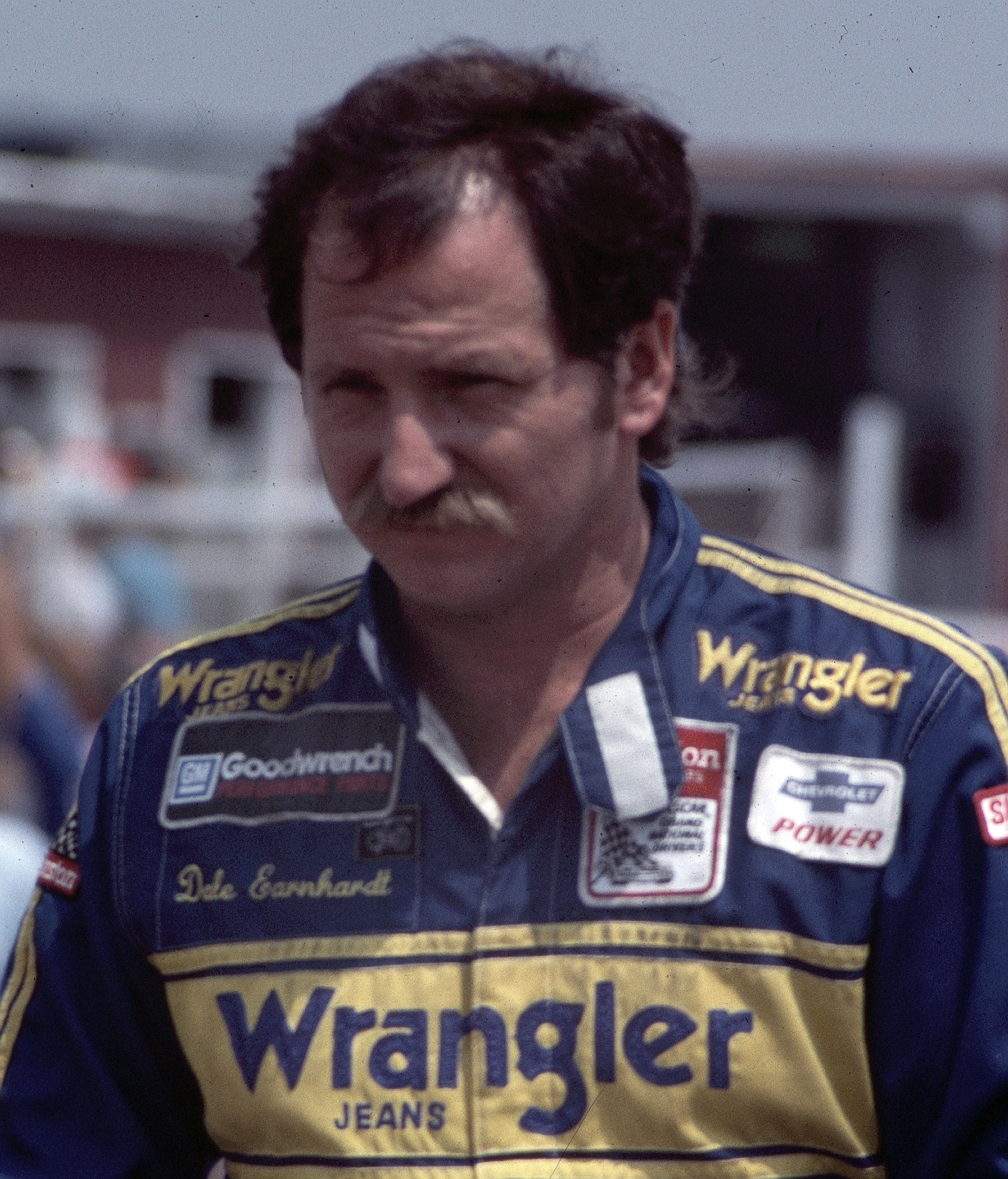
NASCAR driver Dale Earnhardt in his Wrangler racing suit at Pocono Raceway in 1985

1897: Twenty-year-old C.C. Hudson leaves Spring Hill Farm in Williamson County, Tennessee, and makes his way to Greensboro, North Carolina, seeking his fortune in the emerging textile industry. He finds work in a factory making overalls, where he earns 25 cents a day sewing on buttons.

1904; Hudson's workplace closes. He and a few others buy several of the sewing machines, lease space above a downtown grocery store and incorporate as the Hudson Overall Company.

1919: The business builds its first factory on South Elm Street in Greensboro and changes its name to Blue Bell Overall Company.

1936: Blue Bell launches Super Big Ben Overalls made out of 100% Sanforized Fabric that reduces shrinkage after washing to less than 1%. This sets a new standard for the industry.

1943: Blue Bell acquires the Casey Jones Work-Clothes Company and the rights to a rarely used Casey Jones brand name: Wrangler.

1946: Blue Bell starts to develop a jeans line for cowboys, hiring famous tailor "Rodeo Ben". Blue Bell workers take part in a contest to give the jeans a brand name. The winning name is Wrangler, synonymous with the name for a working cowboy.

1947: After designing and testing 13 pairs of prototype jeans, Blue Bell introduces the Wrangler 11MWZ to American consumers. The Wrangler Jeans featured several innovations aimed particularly at cowboys: Felled outseams and inseams, rear pockets positioned for comfort in the saddle, 'no scratch' rivet pocket reinforcement, a zipper fly, and the use of a strong tack in the crotch instead of a metal rivet. A promotional campaign is launched featuring 11MWZ test riders and rodeo legends Freckles Brown, Bill Linderman, and Jim Shoulders.

1952: Lot number 11MWZ is renamed 13MWZ to conform to the 13-ounce-per-yard (400 g/m) denim weight being used to manufacture the style.

1962: Blue Bell opens a factory in Belgium and the Wrangler brand name enjoys a successful launch in Europe.

1974: The Professional Rodeo Cowboys Association (PRCA) officially endorses Wrangler Jeans.

1983: Wrangler sponsor European Football champions Nottingham Forest F.C.

1986: Blue Bell merges with the VF Corporation of Pennsylvania.

1996: One of every five pairs of jeans sold in America is a Wrangler.

1997: The 50th anniversary of the 13MWZ. A Special Collectors Edition of the 13MWZ is created to celebrate this event.

2000: "Whatever You Ride" television ad campaign is launched, focusing on core brand values.

2001: Wrangler commences making its jeans in Mexico.

2002: "There's a bit of the West in all of us" TV and print ad campaign is launched.

2004: A new Wrangler European print campaign is launched, "Wanted," representing a modern expression of Wrangler's roots. Wrangler also celebrates 100 years of manufacturing quality denim by producing Blue Bell by Wrangler, a limited edition collection that reproduces the first Wrangler jeans right down to the last detail. Wrangler also reworks the mainstream collection, producing new fits using icons inspired by the very first jeans designed by Rodeo Ben. The Wrangler brand is now recognized in 22 European countries.

2005: Wrangler's last U.S. sewing plant is closed.

2011: Wrangler conducts consumer design competition to find the next thing in jeans. The winner, Song Anh Nguyen of Greensboro, had her design produced by Wrangler and made available for sale.

2018: Wrangler parent company VF Corporation announces plans to spin off its jeans operations including Wrangler into a separate public company.

2019: Wrangler, together with Lee and Rock & Republic, becomes part of Kontoor Brands, an independent publicly traded spin-off from VF Corporation.

2022: Wrangler Apparel Corp. files a U.S. trademark application for the name WRANGLERVERSE for, among other services, hosting live and virtual performances, concerts, and social entertainment events and providing virtual environments in which users can interact for recreational, leisure, or entertainment purposes. The application signals an intent to expand the WRANGLER brand into the Metaverse.

== See also ==
- Wrangler, for non-trademark meanings of the word
- Lee (jeans)
- VF Corporation
- Rock & Republic
