= Kontoor Brands =

American apparel company

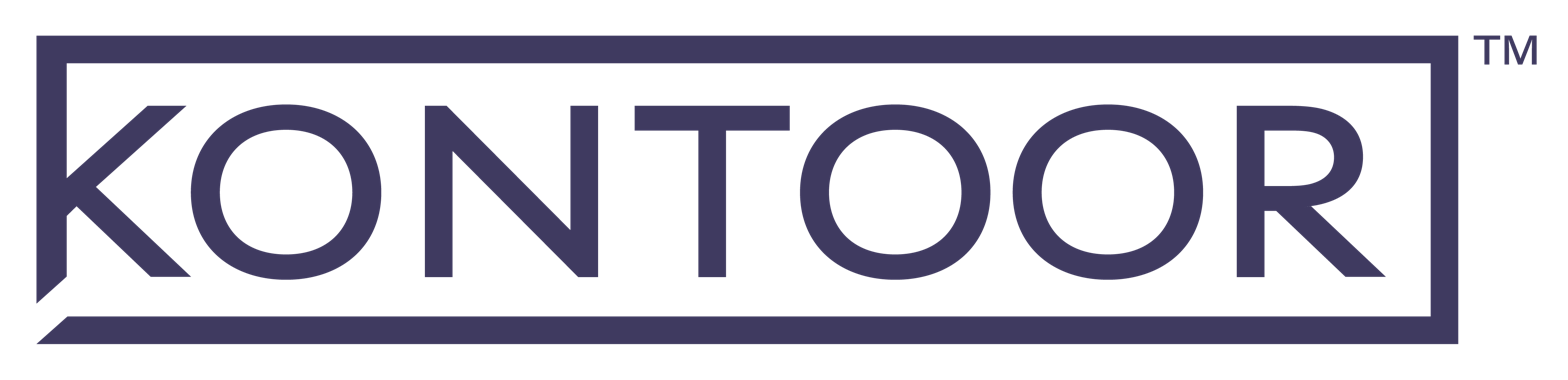
- Type: Public
- Traded as: NYSE: KTB; S&P 600 component
- Industry: Clothing
- Founder: May 2019; 7 years ago
- Headquarters: Greensboro, North Carolina
- Key people: Scott Baxter (CEO)
- Brands: Wrangler; Helly Hansen
- Revenue: ▲US$3.15 billion (2025)
- Net income: ▼US$227 million (2025)
- Number of employees: 15,640
- Website: kontoorbrands.com

Kontoor Brands is an American company that markets clothing under the Wrangler and Helly Hansen brands and operates VF Outlet.

It was a spin off from the VF Corporation in May 2019. At the time of the separation, the company's portfolio included the Wrangler, Lee and Rock & Republic brands, as well as the VF Outlet business. In 2025, Kontoor Brands expanded its portfolio through the acquisition of Helly Hansen and Musto.
