= Missing Sounds of New York =

2020 studio album by the New York Public Library

- Album artwork: Mark Sloan, Claire Manganiello

Studio album by The New York Public Library
- Released: May 1, 2020
- Recorded: April 2020
- Studio: Daughter by Mother New York
- Genre: Ambient
- Length: 16:49
- Label: Mother New York
- Producer: Mother New York

Missing Sounds of New York is an album produced by the New York Public Library, released on May 1, 2020, through the advertising agency Mother New York. It was recorded during the COVID-19 pandemic in New York City in 2020, and includes original and archived audio to replicate the sounds of New York City prior to the lockdowns. The album was met with a positive reception.

== Background and recording ==
During the outbreak of COVID-19 in early 2020, New York City instated a "pause on non-essential services and gatherings" order, which asked its citizens to stay indoors as much as possible and practice social distancing. This caused the city to effectively shut down outside of essential services, and completely transformed the way the formerly-bustling city sounded.

Using a mix of archival and new audio, the latter of which was recorded over 21 days in April 2020, the New York Public Library produced an eight-track album to catalogue the sounds of New York City that its residents were "missing most". The album, titled Missing Sounds of New York, was released on May 1, 2020, on Spotify and SoundCloud.

== Critical reception ==
The album was met with widespread acclaim from both local and national news and the general public. The New York Post said the album "takes our city back from the coronavirus". CoolHunting called it "strangely emotional", saying “these sounds will have any city-dweller feeling simultaneously at home and nostalgic”.

A New York Times article titled "It's Showtime! Press Play to Hear the N.Y.C. That Used to Be" detailed the creation of the album, they profess it "charts the sonic pulse of the city, encompassing a ballgame, a taxi ride and a visit to the library itself". The New Yorker labeled the project a "Soundtrack to a Lost New York".

American Libraries magazine called the album "a love letter to NYC, connecting city dwellers to the familiar sounds of urban life that they love and miss". Campaign US said the album "compiled bustling soundbites which make us yearn for the Big Apple". and had "irreplaceable earhole snippets of the underground rush hour, crowded parks and noisy neighbors".

Many felt the record was reminiscent of a time before the city-wide quarantine. Time Out said, "Whether or not these sounds are part of what makes you love New York, the playlist is a cozy reminder of your life before the shutdown."

== In popular media ==
New York-based social media star Nicolas Heller (@NewYorkNico) did a remote takeover of The New York Public Library's Instagram account on May 6, 2020, to promote the album and the library as a New York institution under COVID-19.

Trevor Noah featured the album on a segment of The Daily Show airing May 13, 2020.

Governor Andrew Cuomo featured the album as the evening's "Deep Breath Moment" in his daily COVID-19 update email on May 4, 2020.

Spotify featured "To See an Underground Show" featuring Kid the Wiz on numerous playlists.

== Track listing ==
| No. | Title | Length |
|---|---|---|
| 1. | "To See an Underground Show" (featuring Kid the Wiz)) | 1:53 |
| 2. | "Romancing Rush Hour" | 2:36 |
| 3. | "Serenity Is a Rowdy City Park" | 2:22 |
| 4. | "Out in Left Field" | 1:05 |
| 5. | "For the Love of Noisy Neighbors" | 2:11 |
| 6. | "I'd Call a Cab to Anywhere" | 1:30 |
| 7. | "Never Call It a Night Again" | 2:53 |
| 8. | "The Not-Quite-Quiet Library" | 2:19 |
| Total length: | | 16:49 |
