= Clive Wilkinson =

South African architect

Clive Wilkinson (born 1954, Cape Town, South Africa) is an architect and interior designer. Acknowledged as a pioneer in workplace design by the IIDA, Wilkinson is perhaps best known for designing the interior of one of the buildings in the Googleplex, the headquarters of Google in Silicon Valley. He has also designed several top global advertising agencies, including JWT in New York City, and Mother Advertising in London. Wilkinson's introduction of urban planning concepts to organize and animate large office projects began with the design of TBWA\Chiat\Day's Los Angeles headquarters in 1998.

== Education and early career ==
Completing his first architectural degree at the University of Cape Town in South Africa, Wilkinson finished his professional schooling in 1980 at the Architectural Association School of Architecture (AA) in London, studying under Rem Koolhaas and Zaha Hadid. He went on to work for Arup and then Terry Farrell, where he became a Design Director and collaborated on such urban renewal projects as TVAM Studios and Alban Gate.

In 1990, after working in Sydney, Australia for six months, Wilkinson relocated from London to Los Angeles to work briefly for Frank Gehry as a Project Manager on the Disney Concert Hall and Chiat/Day’s Venice, Los Angeles offices. By 1991, Wilkinson had established his own firm in Los Angeles. His first project to win international acclaim was the headquarters for the world-renowned advertising agency TBWA\Chiat\Day. Wilkinson transformed an empty warehouse in Los Angeles into an Advertising City where open offices co-exist with a basketball court and Main Street. The outwardly plain-looking structure was made visually dynamic by an addition of a yellow gatehouse entrance with tubular bridge structures.

== Clive Wilkinson Architects ==
With a practice in Los Angeles, California, Clive Wilkinson's eponymous firm, Clive Wilkinson Architects (CWa), completed a 330,000 Square Foot office in Sydney, Australia for Macquarie Group, One Shelley Street, the recipient of multiple architectural awards. The firm then went on to design Macquarie's London Headquarters at Ropemaker Place in 2010. After being named a Finalist in both 2010 and 2011, Clive Wilkinson Architects was awarded the 2012 Cooper–Hewitt, National Design Museum's National Design Award for "Excellence in Interior Design".

In 2012 the firm moved from its West Hollywood headquarters to Culver City - into its own building on Washington Boulevard, which the firm designed and built from ground up and which includes the coffee shop Cognoscenti at street level.

Recent projects include the design of new offices for radio station and NPR affiliate, KCRW in Santa Monica, including a new facility for Santa Monica College's Academy of Entertainment Technology campus which was awarded 2018 Best of Year Winner for Higher Education and designing new buildings for the UCLA School of Theater, Film and Television.

The firm has collaborated with several other architects on prestigious projects: with WRNS Studio on new buildings for Intuit in Silicon Valley, with Bjarke Ingels Group (BIG) on the 1M sq.ft. Google Caribbean project, and with Morphosis Architects on the 560,000 sq.ft. headquarters building for lululemon in Vancouver, Canada.

In 2019, Wilkinson completed his second house for his family in West Los Angeles, which received Interior Design Magazine's 2019 Best of Year Award and was featured on the cover of the November/December 2019 issue of Dwell Magazine.

In 2019, Wilkinson released his first book ‘The Theatre of Work’ with Frame Publishers in Holland. The book examines the history of the workplace and outlines a thesis for elevating the experience of the office to the level of compelling theatre. It includes fourteen case studies of his firm's work, based on seven design principles.

== Additional Accolades ==
In 2005, Wilkinson was inducted into Interior Design Magazine's Hall of Fame, and selected as a "Master of Design" by Fast Company (magazine) in 2006. In 2008 The New York Times featured an article about Wilkinson and the Norwich Drive Residence, a home he built for himself in West Hollywood. In 2019 Wilkinson was awarded Contract Magazine's "Legend Award."
