= Henry Ley =

Henry Ley may refer to:

- Henry Ley (organist) (1887–1962), English organist, composer and music teacher
- Henry Ley, 2nd Earl of Marlborough (1595–1638), English peer and Member of Parliament
- Henry Ley of the Ley baronets

== See also ==
- Henry Lee (disambiguation)
