= Harold Lee =

Harold Lee may refer to:

- Harold Lee (footballer) (1884-1954), see List of Arsenal F.C. players (25–99 appearances)
- Harold B. Lee (1899–1973), eleventh president of The Church of Jesus Christ of Latter-day Saints
- Harold Lee (character), fictional character in the Harold & Kumar film series
- Harold Lee, cowboy featured in Death in the West (1983), who was dying of lung cancer from smoking when interviewed
- Hal Lee (1905–1989), baseball player
- Harold Lee Hsiao-wo (1910–1980), founders and first chairman of Television Broadcasts Limited (TVB)

== See also ==
- Harry Lee (disambiguation)
