= Googleplex =

Google assistant

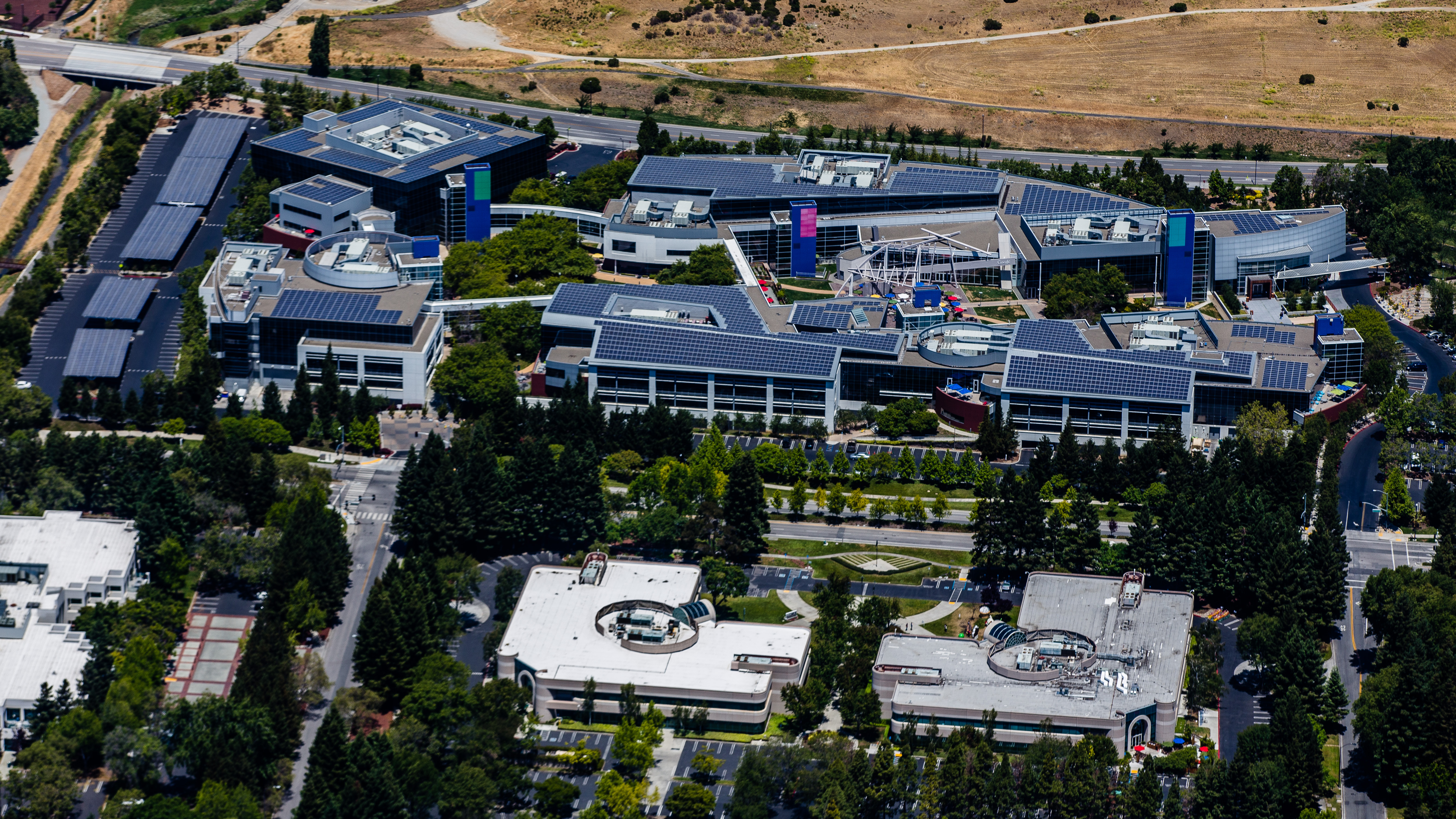
- Aerial view of the main Google Campus in Mountain View, CA
- Built: July 2004; 22 years ago
- Location: 1600 Amphitheatre Parkway Mountain View, CA 94043; Mountain View, California, United States
- Coordinates: 37.422°N 122.084°W

The Googleplex is the corporate headquarters complex of Google and its parent company, Alphabet Inc. It is located at 1600 Amphitheatre Parkway in Mountain View, California.

The original complex, with 2 million square feet (190,000 square meters) of office space, is the company's second-largest square footage assemblage of Google buildings, after Google's 111 Eighth Avenue building in New York City, which the company bought in 2010.

"Googleplex" is a portmanteau of Google and complex (meaning a complex of buildings) and a reference to googolplex, the name given to the large number 10^{10^{100}}, or 10^{googol}.

== Facilities and history ==
The south side of the Googleplex as visible c. 2006

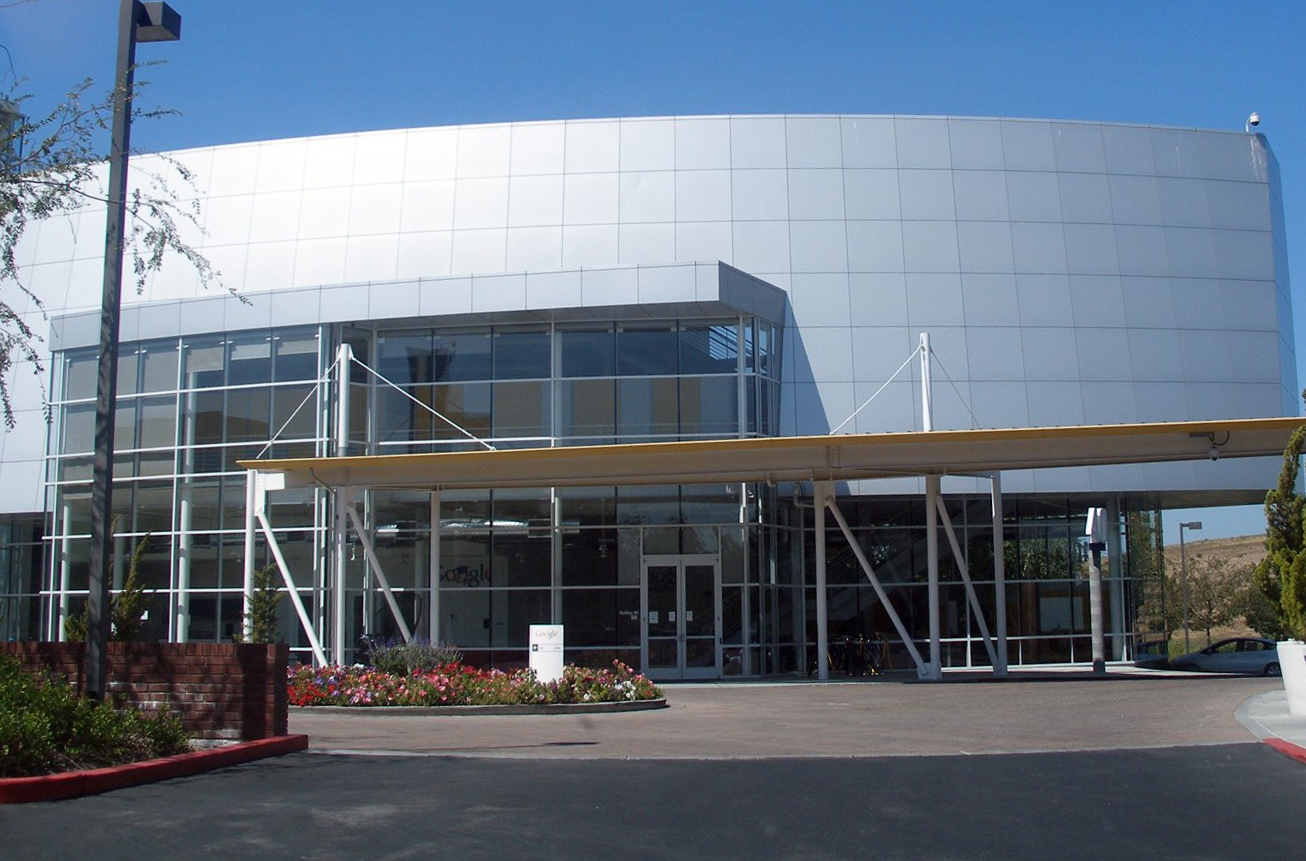
Former entrance to the lobby of Building 40

=== The original campus ===
==== SGI campus ====
The site was previously occupied by Silicon Graphics (SGI). The office space and corporate campus is located within a larger 26-acre (11-hectare) site that contains Charleston Park, a 5-acre (2-hectare) public park; improved access to Permanente Creek; and public roads that connect the corporate site to Shoreline Park and the Bay Trail. The project, launched in 1994, was built on the site of one of the few working farms in the area and was city owned at the time (identified as "Farmer's Field" in the planning documents). The Charleston Park development was created through a collaboration involving Silicon Graphics, SWA Group and the Planning and Community Development Agency of Mountain View. The objective was to develop in complementary fashion the privately owned corporate headquarters and adjoining public greenspace. Key design decisions placed parking for nearly 2000 cars underground, enabling SWA to integrate the two open spaces with water features, shallow pools, fountains, pathways, and plazas. The project was completed in 1997. The American Society of Landscape Architects (ASLA) noted that the SGI project was a significant departure from typical corporate campuses and which challenged conventional thinking about private and public space, and awarded the project the ASLA Centennial Medallion in 1999.

==== Google campus ====
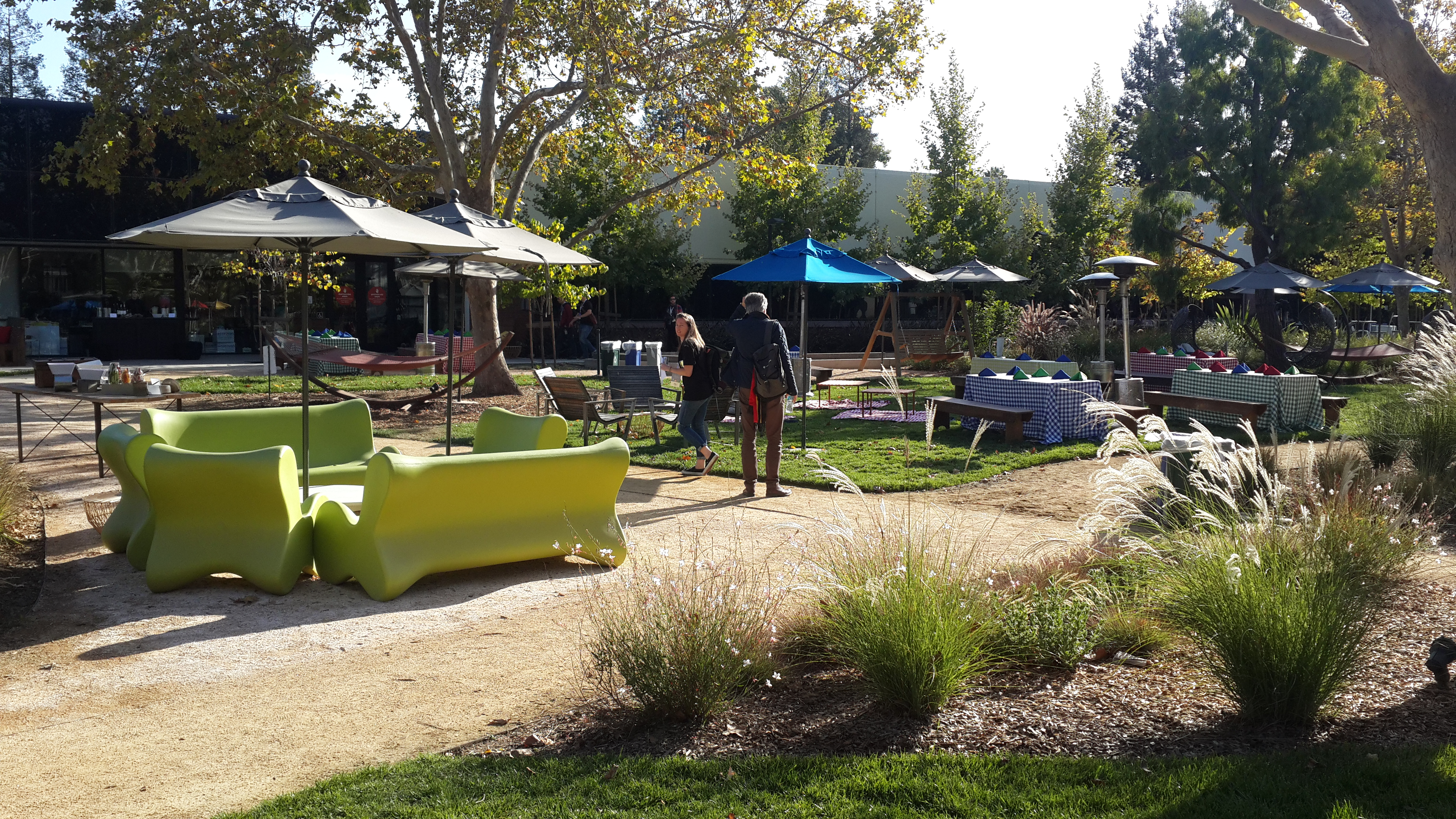
This Google campus area is down Charleston Road from the Googleplex.

The former SGI facilities were leased by Google beginning in 2003. A redesign of the interiors was completed by Clive Wilkinson Architects in 2005. In June 2006, Google purchased some of Silicon Graphics's properties, including the Googleplex, for $319 million.

Because the buildings are of relatively low height, the complex sprawls out over a large area of land. The interior of the headquarters is furnished with items like shade lamps and giant rubber balls and the lobby contains a piano and a projection of current live Google search queries. Facilities include free laundry rooms (Buildings 40, 42 & CL3), two small swimming pools, multiple sand volleyball courts, a bowling alley, massage rooms, organic gardens, and eighteen cafeterias with diverse menus. Google installed replicas of SpaceShipOne and a dinosaur skeleton.

Since 2017, solar panels cover the rooftops of eight buildings and two solar carports, capable of producing 1.6 megawatts of electricity. At the time of installation, Google believed it to be the largest in the United States among corporations. The panels provide the power for 30% of the peak electricity demand in their solar-powered buildings. Four 100kW Bloom Energy Servers were shipped to Google in July 2008, as the first customer of Bloom Energy.

The Android lawn statues were outside of Building 44 on Charleston Road, and were relocated on the Google campus at 1981 Landings Drive. They include a giant green statue of the Android logo and additional statues to represent all the versions of the Android operating system.

=== Bay View addition ===
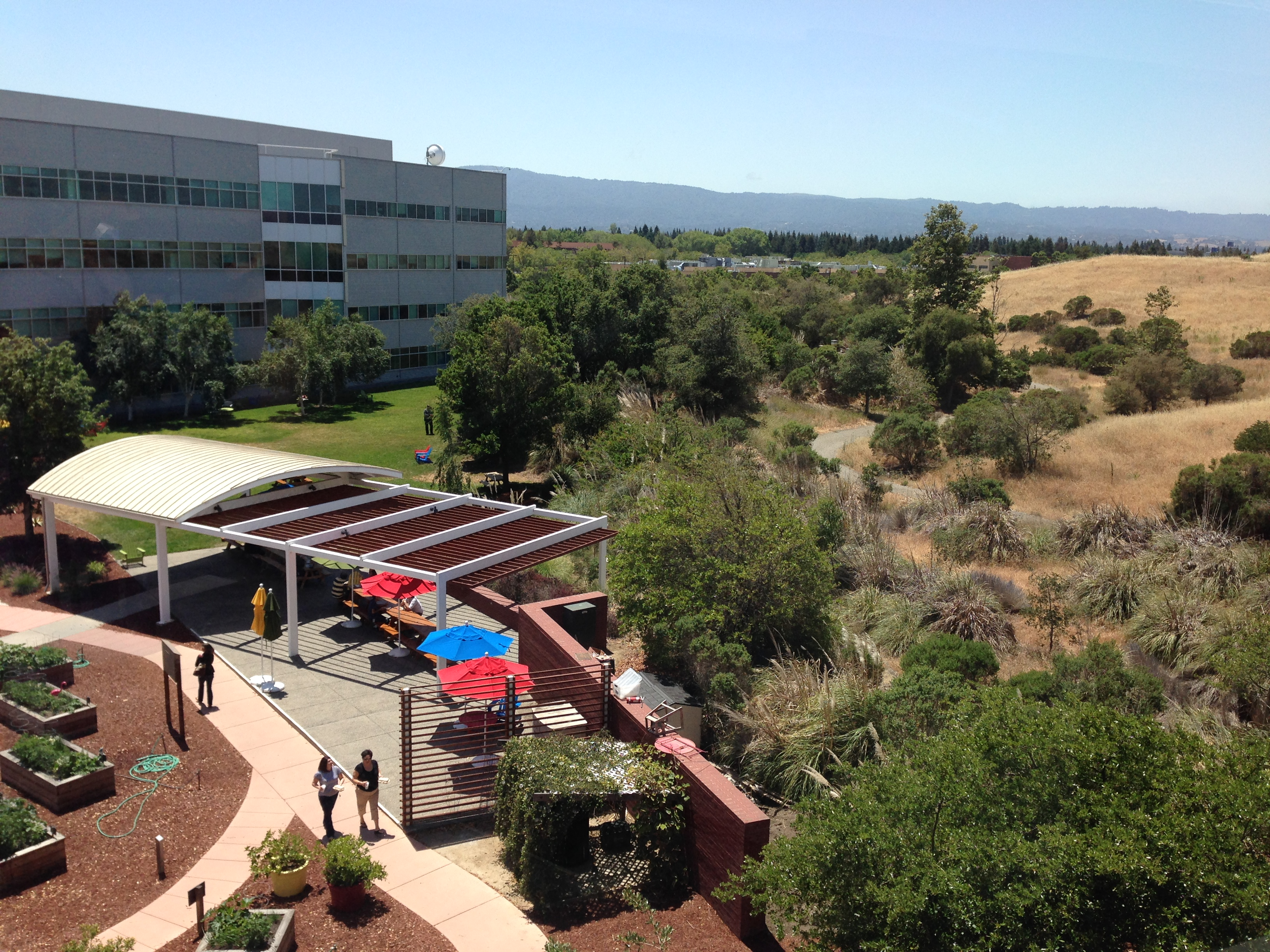
Google buildings are near Shoreline Park.

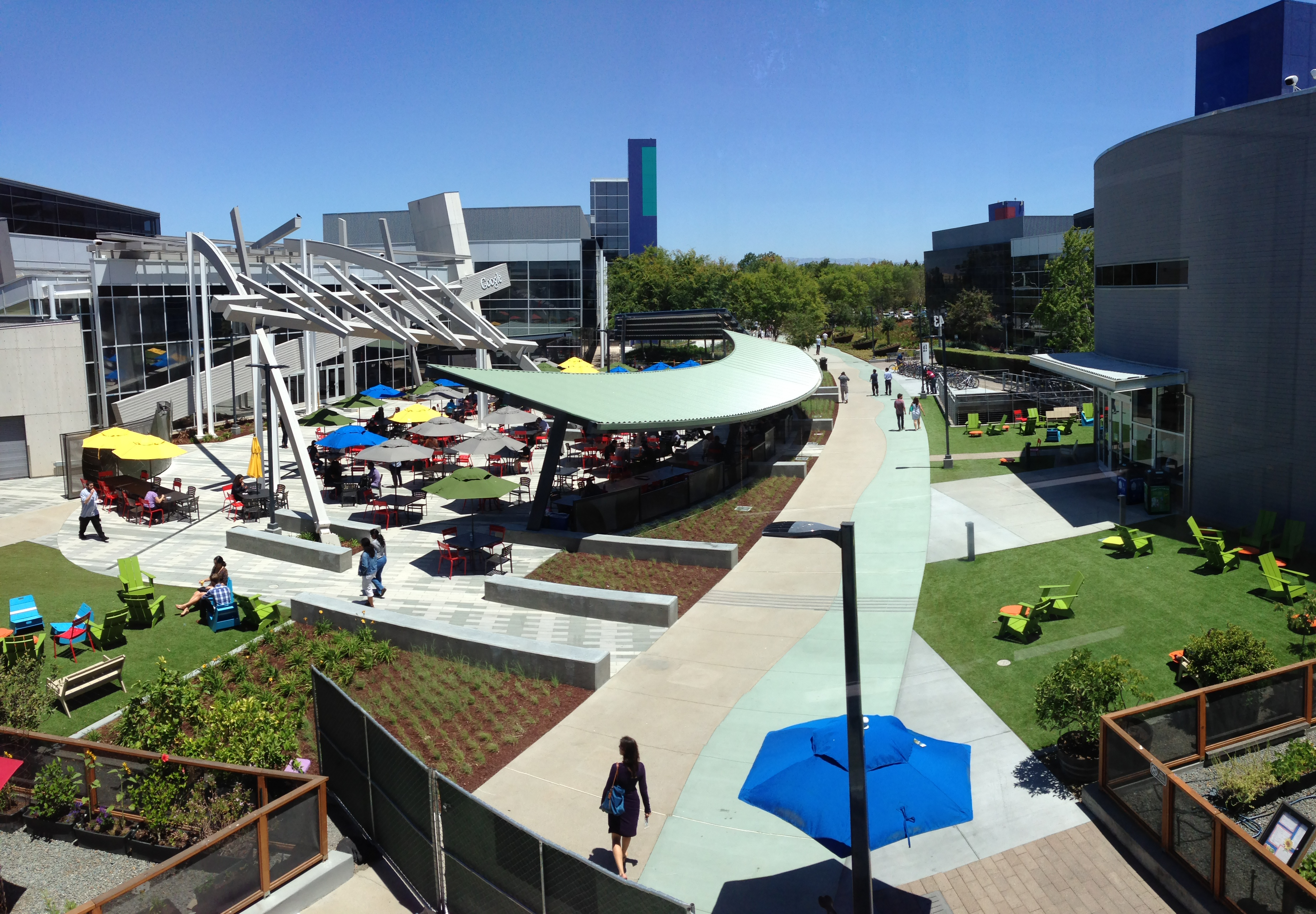
Googleplex courtyard

In 2013, construction began on a new 1.1-million-square-foot (100,000-square-meter) campus dubbed "Bay View", adjoining the original campus on 42 acres (17 ha) leased from the NASA Ames Research Center and overlooking San Francisco Bay at Moffett Federal Airfield. The estimated cost of the project was $120 million with a target opening date of 2015.

NBBJ was the architect and this was the first time Google has designed its own buildings.

The addition is off the northeast corner of the complex, by the Stevens Creek Nature Study Area and Shoreline Park. Before announcing the construction, Google, through its internal real estate firm, Planetarium Ventures, sought permission from the City of Mountain View to build bridges over the adjacent Stevens Creek. 2012 year-end annual report noted it can develop only 7 acres (2.8 ha) of the 42-acre (17-hectare) site.

Google planned in 2015 a 60-acre (24-hectare) addition designed by Heather wicked Studio and in North . The site, however, was granted to LinkedIn by the city councilors and the Google project was revised in 2016, with 3 buildings to be built on 2 different sites east of Googleplex in Mountain View: one immediately next to Googleplex, and the two smaller ones a few blocks away.

=== Google Visitor Experience ===
In September 2023, Google announced the Google Visitor Experience, a visitor center next to the Googleplex which occupies the building formerly known as Charleston East, and now known as Gradient Canopy. The visitor center includes a Google Store, a public plaza, a café, and public art, and opened on October 12, 2023.

== Location ==
The Googleplex is located between Charleston Road, Amphitheatre Parkway, and Shoreline Boulevard in north Mountain View, California, close to the Shoreline Park wetlands. Employees living in San Francisco, the East Bay, or South Bay may take a free Wi-Fi-enabled Google shuttle to and from work. The shuttles are powered by a fuel blend of 95% petroleum diesel and 5% biodiesel and are equipped with emissions reduction technology.

To the north lies the Shoreline Amphitheatre and Intuit, and to the south lies Microsoft's Silicon Valley research complex, the Computer History Museum, and Century Theatres. Moffett Field is nearby to the east.

== Other Google Mountain View locations ==
Google in its 2012-year-end annual report said it had 3.5 million square feet of office space in Mountain View.

Google has another large campus in Mountain View dubbed "The Quad" at 399 North Whisman Road about 3 miles (5 kilometers) from the Googleplex.

In 2013, Google leased the entire Mayfield Mall, an enclosed shopping mall that last operated in 1984 and was leased by Hewlett-Packard from 1986 to 2002.

The semi-secret Google X Lab, which is the development lab for items such as Google Glass, is located in "ordinary two-story red-brick buildings" about 1/2 mile (800 meters) from the Googleplex. It has a "burbling fountain out front and rows of company-issued bikes, which employees use to shuttle to the main campus."

== In popular culture ==
The Googleplex is depicted in the 2013 film The Internship, with the Georgia Tech campus standing in as a double, because Google disallows filming on the campus grounds for privacy reasons. It was the inspiration for the fictional Hooli headquarters in the HBO TV series Silicon Valley. The fictional tech company Nudle in the 2016 video game Watch Dogs 2 has a headquarters based on Googleplex.
