= Rock & Republic =

Defunct American jeans brand

Rock and Republic
- Rock & Republic Robertson Blvd., West Hollywood store facade
- Type: Private
- Industry: Clothing
- Founded: 2002; 24 years ago
- Founder: Michael Ball
- Fate: Rebirth and Revival
- Headquarters: United States
- Area served: Worldwide
- Products: Jeans
- Brands: Rock & Republic
- Owner: From Kontoor to Montana West (March, 2026)
- Parent: Montana West, Inc.

Rock & Republic was an American jeans brand founded by Michael Ball in 2002. Ball is a cyclist who gained design experience by creating his cycling team's uniforms. Rock & Republic's line of jeans and casual wear "VB Rocks" was designed by singer Victoria Beckham until 2008.

== Timelines ==
From 2007 to 2009, the company sponsored a professional cycling team named Rock Racing.

On April 1, 2010, Rock & Republic filed for Chapter 11 bankruptcy protection. By December 2010, the company had entered into negotiations with VF Corporation to sell the trademark and intellectual property. On April 28, 2011, VF Corporation announced it had signed a long-term licensing deal with Kohl's to carry a budget version of the Rock & Republic brand with jeans priced at $88 versus $200 plus. In 2019, VF Corporation spun-off its jeans business, including the Rock & Republic, Lee, and Wrangler brands, into a new business called Kontoor Brands.

In 2026, as part of a strategic realignment, Kontoor Brands, Inc. divested the Rock & Republic brand and its associated business operations. The transaction was completed on March 3, 2026, and Kontoor subsequently disclosed the sale in its first‑quarter financial report issued in April 2026, confirming that the sale had been finalized.

The Rock & Republic brand, along with all of its brand assets, was acquired by Montana West, Inc., a company in the apparel and bag industry, headquartered in Dallas, Texas, U.S.. To facilitate the transition and oversee the brand's ongoing development, Montana West established a dedicated holding entity, Rock Republic Brand Holdings, to manage the integration and future growth of the acquired business.

== See also ==
- VF Corporation
- Lee (jeans)
- Wrangler (jeans)
