= Buddy Lee =

Advertising mascot for Lee Jeans

Buddy Lee rolled up his sleeve to promote blood donation on behalf of the American Red Cross in an ad after the September 11, 2001, attacks.

Buddy Lee was an advertising mascot for Lee Jeans. The doll, a promotional item for the company from 1920 to 1962, was brought back as the star of television advertising for the company's Lee Dungarees line from 1998 until the mid-2000s.

== Early years ==
Sales manager Chester Reynolds, later Lee's board president, came up with the idea of using a doll to "model" miniature versions of the company's clothes for store displays. The 12½-inch composition dolls first appeared in the windows of Dayton's flagship store on Nicollet Mall in Minneapolis, then were used at stores nationwide.

Lee encouraged stores to sell the dolls after the displays were taken down, and later provided the dolls for retail sale, including versions dressed as a cowboy, Coca-Cola deliveryman, railroad worker and gas station attendant. Starting in 1949, Buddy Lee was produced as a 13-inch hard plastic doll.

Although female versions of the so-called Betty Lee doll surface from time to time, there was no official Betty Lee doll ever made by the H. D. Lee Company; they never made any female doll at all. These dolls instead are composition carnival dolls (term used by collectors – dolls sold at carnivals as prizes) that look similar to the Buddy Lee doll. This information is direct from the historian who researched the Lee company archives in 2008 for a special Lee company function on the Buddy Lee doll.

The Buddy Lee dolls were discontinued in 1962 because they were no longer profitable. By then, Buddy Lee had become the second-highest-selling doll in the United States.

== Television advertising ==
In 1998, ad agency Fallon McElligott brought back the doll, along with the 1940s Lee tagline "Can't Bust 'Em," to promote the Lee Dungarees line, aimed at 17- to 22-year-old males. The main campaign was preceded by guerrilla marketing techniques, including movie trailer-style teaser spots, unbranded posters of the doll, and a 6-minute mockumentary, "The Buddy Lee Story," which was aired in segments during late-night cable television. The 1998 TV spots – "Car," "Twister" and "Parachute" – were directed by Spike Jonze while Phil Morrison helmed the 1999 TV spots: "Actress" co-starring Sarah Michelle Gellar, "Animal Guy" co-starring Jack Hanna, "Blues Guy" co-starring Bobby Womack, "Sergeant" and "Fans".

The comedic ads touted the unmoving Buddy Lee as a "Man of Action." The doll was usually presented as a heroic figure who survived all manner of certain doom, prompting his human co-stars to marvel at the durability of his jeans. Three nemeses for Buddy Lee – Curry, Roy, and Super Greg (the latter portrayed by Sacha Baron Cohen). – were introduced in 2000 through Web sites and appeared in three TV spots directed by Fredrik Bond.

In Comedy Central's BattleBots, Buddy Lee was used in a four-wheel drive robot armored with a sheet metal fire truck, but inside the truck was 1/4" thick aluminum, meaning he was relatively well-protected and known as "Buddy Lee Don't Play in the Street."

The following year, Lee Dungarees ads adopted a heroic folk theme song for the doll and the tagline "Be Like Buddy Lee" sung by Junior Brown. Besides "Apartment," "Street" and "Suburbia" directed by Ulf Johansson and Mats Lindberg from Traktor and "Barbershop" directed by Craig Gillespie, this series also included a special unbranded ad – directed by Fallon art director Harvey Marco and aired on behalf of the American Red Cross after the September 11, 2001 attacks – in which the doll sports a rolled-up sleeve, bandage and "I Gave" sticker to promote blood donation.

2002's campaign consisting of the TV spots "Cheese" and "Emu" was directed by Dante Ariola while Chris Smith helmed 2003's "Trailer," "The Chase" and "Hall of Mirrors."

In November 2004, the doll starred in "Buddy Lee: Guidance Counselor," a Jon Nowak-directed series of three 6-minute sponsored segments on otherwise commercial-free episodes of MTV2's interactive show Control Freak. Viewers voting online for videos on the show were also asked to choose one of three outcomes for the Buddy Lee segments.

In 2005, Buddy Lee was promoted as a write-in presidential candidate for the 2008 election.

== Related links ==
- buddylee.com via Internet Archive
- "The Buddy Lee Story" video at YouTube
- Fallon Web site; includes video on Control Freak promotion and an overview of the Buddy Lee: Guidance Counselor campaign
- buddyleeguidancecounselor.com mirror 1 mirror 2
