= Smuggler Entertainment =

Production company in California, United States

- Company type: Private
- Industry: Film, television, commercials, music videos
- Founded: 2002; 24 years ago
- Founders: Patrick Milling-Smith; Brian Carmody
- Headquarters: Los Angeles, California, United States
- Services: Production company
- Website: smugglersite.com

Smuggler Entertainment is an American production company founded in 2002 by Patrick Milling-Smith and Brian Carmody. The company produces commercials, virtual reality projects, music videos, and notable theatrical productions.

Smuggler has been nominated for 10 Emmy Awards and has won Emmy Awards for Outstanding Commercial in 2017, 2020, and 2022.

== Overview ==
Smuggler Entertainment was founded in 2002 by Patrick Miling-Smith and Brian Carmody. Smuggler directors team for commercials and music videos, including Kathryn Bigelow, Barry Jenkins, Todd Field, Tom Hooper, Jonah Hill, Henry Alex, and Miles Jay.

Smuggler has produced several series on notable platforms, including Netflix and Apple TV+. It also created a four-part docuseries about Lionel Messi for Apple TV+. It has worked on commercial projects, including Apple, Loewe, and Fanta.

In 2016, Smuggler and Red Arrow Studios participated to launch Cove Pictures, a TV production company focused on high-end drama, comedy and factual programs. In 2019, it created Skittles Commercial: The Broadway Musical, starring Michael C. Hall, which was performed as a one-day-only event.

Smuggler's notable theatrical productions include the Broadway run of "Macbeth," directed by Sam Gold and starring Daniel Craig and Ruth Negga, and the musical "Sing Street," which had a Boston run before its Broadway debut.

The company also produced the internationally acclaimed musical "Once," which won eight Tony Awards, and the stage adaptation of Robert Evans’ memoir, "The Kid Stays in the Picture," which was performed at the Royal Court Theatre in London. The play was written by Jon Robin Baitz.
