= Fallon Worldwide =

Advertising agency

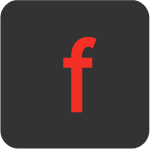
- Type: Subsidiary
- Industry: advertising agency
- Founded: 1981
- Headquarters: AT&T Tower; Minneapolis, Minnesota, United States
- Parent: Publicis
- Website: www.fallon.com

Fallon is a full-service advertising agency headquartered in Minneapolis, Minnesota, with affiliate offices in London, Detroit, and Tokyo. It is a subsidiary of Publicis.

== History ==
Fallon was founded in 1981 as Fallon McElligott Rice in 1981 by Patrick Fallon, Tom McElligott, Nancy Rice, Fred Senn and Irv Fish. Fallon printed a full-page agency manifesto in the Minneapolis Star and Minneapolis Tribune in 1981, seeking “companies that would rather outsmart the competition than outspend them”—a cold call for national advertising work that ran only in the local papers, and a “provocative message pitching scientific thinking and a condemnation of the prevailing strategies of the industry.”

Fallon McElligott Rice's first national client was an insurance agency, ITT Life. In 1981, the agency added several more national accounts to its roster, including The Wall Street Journal, US West, and the Episcopal Church. The agency was named Ad Age's Agency of the Year in 1983, 1995, 1997 and, was the Comeback Agency of the Year in 2015.

== Notable campaigns ==
- Rolling Stone – Perception/Reality, increased Rolling Stone's ad pages by 81% in just four years
- Jim Beam – Back to the Basics
- Lee Jeans – Buddy Lee, increased Rolling Stone's ad pages by 81% in just four years
- McDonald's – Arch Deluxe, one of the largest ad campaign failures ever
- BMW – The Hire
- Cadbury Dairy Milk – Gorilla

== Key people ==
- Pat Fallon – co-founder
- Tom McElligott – co-founder, creative director
- Mike Buchner – chairman
