= FRANK (drugs) =

National drug education service in the UK

FRANK is a national anti-drug advisory service jointly established by the Department of Health and Home Office of the British government in 2003. Responsibility for FRANK passed from the Home Office to Public Health England in 2013. It is intended to reduce the use of both legal and illegal drugs by educating teenagers and adolescents about the potential effects of drugs. It has run many media campaigns on television, radio and the internet.

== Services ==
As of November 2026, FRANK provides the following services for people who seek information and/or advice about drugs:

- A website
- A confidential telephone number, available 24 hours a day
- Email
- A text message service
- A service to locate counselling and treatment

An online live chat service, open from 2pm to 6pm daily, was added to the website in 2013. A Home Office evaluation published in 2017 found that website visits and emails to FRANK rose from 2.76 million in 2009/10 to 7.92 million in 2014/15, while calls to the helpline fell from about 319,000 to 97,000 over the same period. In 2023 Huck reported that the website was run by Cxpartners and the call centre by Serco. Figures it obtained under a freedom of information request showed that unique page views of the website had fallen every year since 2015, from 20.1 million to 8 million in 2022, and that the helpline and chat services had 38,240 unique interactions in 2022.

== Campaigns ==
Talk To Frank, along with RSA Films produced a short film in 2007 entitled "Brain Warehouse". The film, directed by Ronnie West, follows 10 teenage boys and girls who are using different drugs and explores the positive and negative aspects of recreational drug use.

The most well-known Frank advertisements are focused on Pablo, a small dog used as a mule to smuggle cocaine into the United Kingdom. Voiced by David Mitchell, the 6 adverts follow Pablo as he attempts to learn about cocaine and why people choose to use it. The adverts received much praise from the media and general public.

In October 2011 the Home Office resumed FRANK advertising, the first since the coalition government's spending freeze of 2010, with radio, print and online adverts aimed at 11- to 18-year-olds. Central government spending on drug media and information activity varied from £23,000 in 2010/11 to £1.5 million in 2012/13 and £166,000 in 2014/15, depending on whether FRANK marketing was carried out in a given year. For the service's tenth anniversary in January 2013, the Home Office launched three adverts aimed at 13- to 18-year-olds, shown on youth channels for six months and ending with the line "Confused by drugs? Talk to FRANK". Huck reported in 2023 that the service had run no new campaigns since then.

== Criticism ==
In 2007, FRANK removed a website article titled "Cannabis Explained" after several groups pointed out errors in the information presented.

The Conservative MP Iain Duncan Smith criticised FRANK and drug education more generally in a February 2010 speech, arguing that "Drugs education programmes, such as Talk to FRANK, have failed on prevention and intervention, instead progressively focussing on harm reduction and risk minimisation, which can be counter-productive." The Centre for Social Justice, a right-wing think tank set up by Duncan Smith, further argued in a December 2010 paper that FRANK "has proved ineffectual and even damaging, to the point of giving information as to the ‘cost’ and immediate physical effects of drugs more prominently than driving home the danger."

The Home Office's 2017 evaluation of the 2010 drug strategy reported that after its 2014/15 campaign on new psychoactive substances that directed young people to FRANK, 34 per cent of 15- to 18-year-olds who visited the website and completed a survey said they were less likely to take so-called "legal highs", while 22 per cent said they were more likely.
