= Lee (brand) =

American brand of denim jeans

- Industry: Clothing
- Founded: 1889; 137 years ago
- Founder: Harry David Lee
- Headquarters: Greensboro, North Carolina, U.S.
- Number of employees: 400 people
- Parent: Kontoor Brands (2019–present)
- Website: lee.com

Lee is an American brand of jeans made from denim, first produced in 1889 in Salina, Kansas. The company is owned by Kontoor Brands, a spin-off of VF Corporation's Jeanswear Division. Since 2019 its headquarters has been in Greensboro, North Carolina, relocated from Merriam, Kansas. The company states that it is an international retailer and manufacturer of casual wear and work wear and that it has more than 400 employees in the United States. In Australasia, the brand has been owned by Pacific Brands since 2007, after it was acquired from Yakka.

== History ==
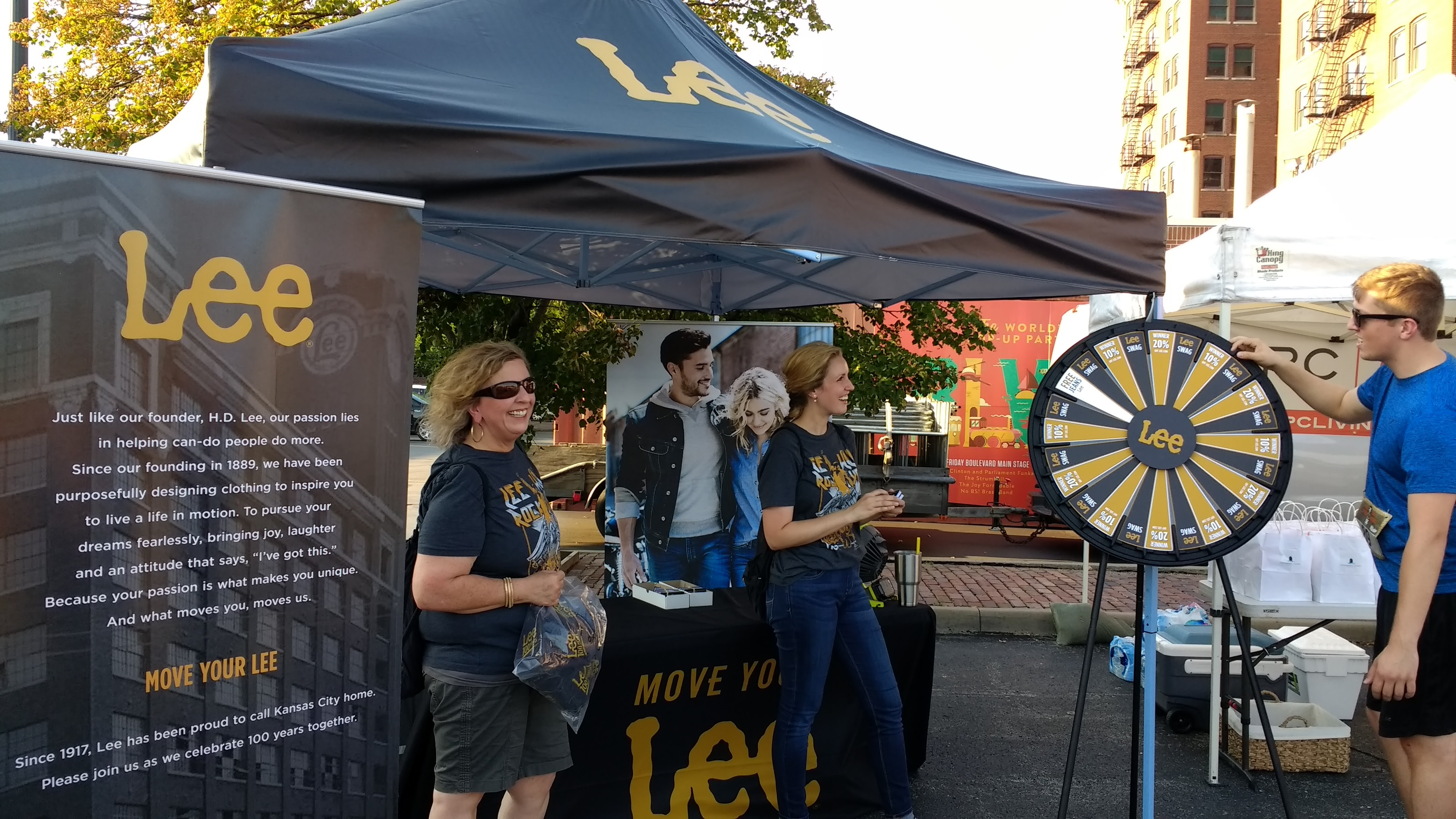
A Lee Jeans booth at a local 5k race in Kansas City

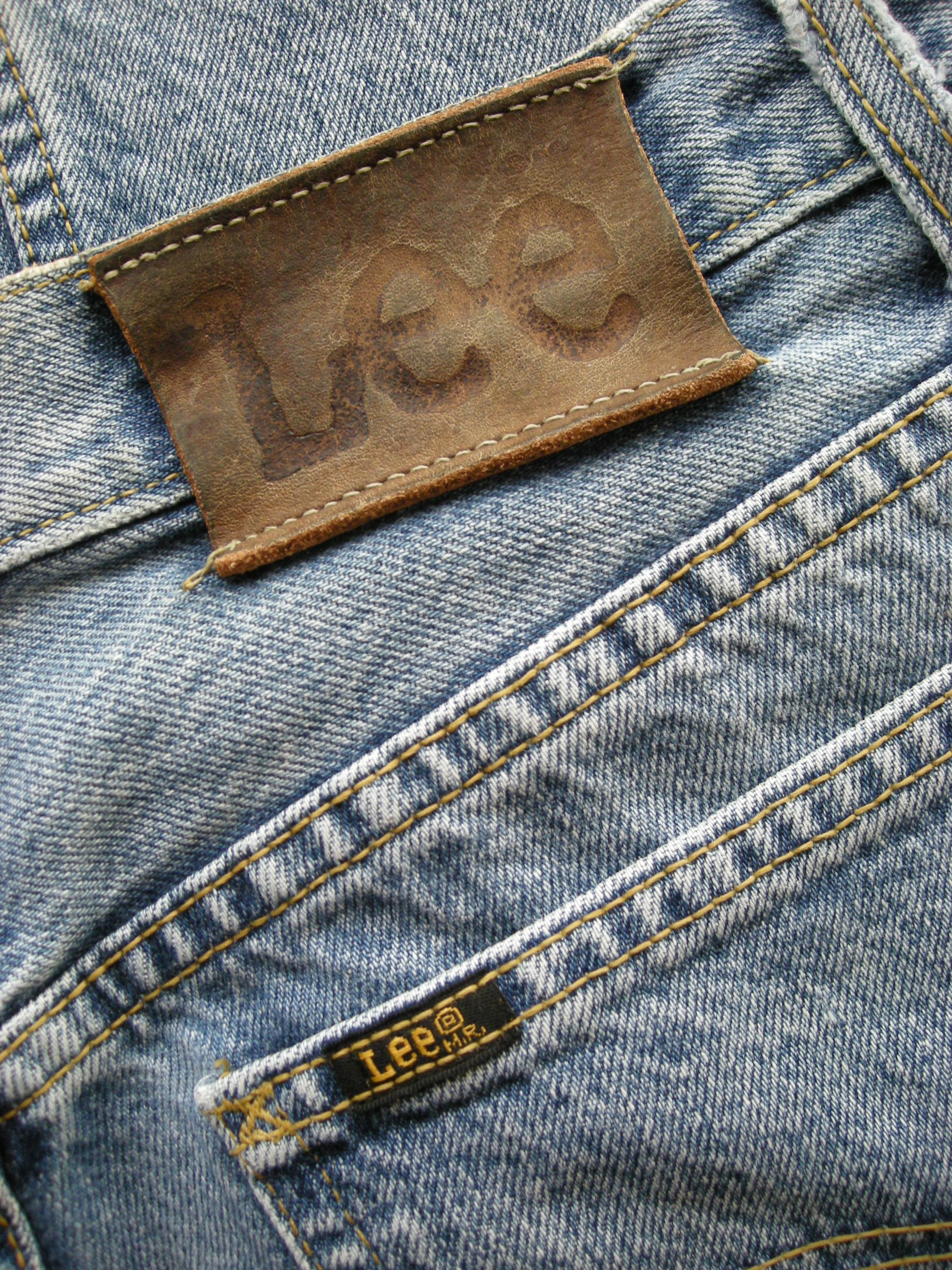
The identification patch on a set of Lee jeans

The company was formed in 1889 by Henry David Lee as the HD Lee Mercantile Company at Salina, Kansas, producing dungarees and jackets. The growth of Lee was prompted by the introduction of the Union-All work jumpsuit in 1913 and their first overall in 1920. Later in the 1920s Lee introduced a zipper fly and continued to expand. Around this time, the first children's overalls line was sold. In 1928 H.D. Lee, founder and president of The H.D. Lee Mercantile Company, died. During the 1930s and 1940s the company became the leading manufacturer of work clothes in the US. In 1944, the Lazy "S" became the official Lee back pocket. Buddy Lee dolls were a promotional item. In 1954, Lee expanded into casual wear. During the 1960s the company expanded to 81 countries and in 1969 was acquired by VF Corporation, becoming a brand. Lee aired its first television advertisement, which promoted Lee western wear.

In the 1970s Lee shifted its focus from the workwear business and began catering to fashion cycles. Lee created an all-new fit for women under the Ms. Lee label. A youth wear line for boys and girls was introduced. In 1996, the company launched Lee National Denim Day as part of National Breast Cancer Awareness Month. Working with the Entertainment Industry Foundation, Lee National Denim Day has raised over $75 million to help fund breast cancer research programs. In 2014, the brand was relaunched in Paris via the Citadium Paris store. In 2019, Lee, Wrangler, Rock & Republic, and VF Outlet were separated from VF Corporation into Kontoor Brands.

On May 21, 2026, Kontoor announced the sale of Lee Jeans to Authentic Brands Group for $750 million plus up to $250 million depending on the brand's performance in the future.

== Manufacturing ==
Lee Factory sit-in

In 1981, 240 factory workers in Greenock, Scotland, staged a sit-in in protest against plans to move the factory to Northern Ireland. What was planned as a one-night protest continued for seven months. The protest became recognised as a gender issue and part of working class social history, as women led the workers union, and peacefully deferred the shut-down for a number of years.

Anniversary events are still held to mark the protest. On the 30th anniversary, MSPs in the Scottish Parliament, debated a motion to "salute the workers for capturing the imagination of the whole country and achieving a landmark victory against a US multinational", and on the 40th anniversary in 2021, Greenock local government held a commemorative dinner of fish and chips (which was what had been brought to feed sit-in workers). In 2026, The National Theatre of Scotland and Tron Theatre released a touring play, by Frances Poet Stand & Deliver: The Lee Jeans Sit-In.

As of 2005, Lee Jeans have been manufactured by Arvind Mills, in a number of small factories in Chamarajanagar, India. About 60,000 workers produce 5,000 pairs of jeans a day.

== Advertising ==
In the 1930s "The Great Lee Success Story" advertisements were launched that led to Lee's slogan "The Jeans that Built America".

Within the United States, the company spends more than $40 million per year on advertising. In 2009, Olson was appointed as the lead interactive agency for the American brand and redesigned their website. Barkley Inc. had previously handled interactive advertising for the brand. Arnold Worldwide continues to provide offline advertising services for the brand.

== See also ==
- Rock & Republic
- X Games
