= Gun control after the Sandy Hook Elementary School shooting =

Gun control discussion following the 2012 Sandy Hook Elementary School shooting

After the Sandy Hook Elementary School shooting, multiple gun laws were proposed in the United States at the federal and state levels. The shooting renewed debate about gun control. The debates focused on requiring background checks on all firearm sales (called universal background checks), and on passing new and expanded assault weapon bans and bans on magazines capable of holding more than 10 rounds.

== Background ==
On December 14, 2012, twenty children and six adults were murdered at Sandy Hook Elementary School in Newtown, Connecticut. One other adult, the shooter's mother, had been murdered before the shooter went to the school. He committed suicide after hearing the police arrive. It was the deadliest primary school shooting, the fourth-deadliest mass shooting by a single person, and one of the deadliest mass shootings in U.S. history.

== Initial response ==
Within hours of the shooting, a We the People user started a petition asking the White House to "immediately address the issue of gun control through the introduction of legislation in Congress," and the gun control advocacy group the Brady Campaign to Prevent Gun Violence reported that an avalanche of donations caused its website to crash. That afternoon, President Barack Obama made a televised statement offering condolences on behalf of the nation to Connecticut governor, Dannel Malloy and saying, "we're going to have to come together and take meaningful action to prevent more tragedies like this, regardless of the politics." Speaking at a December 16 memorial service in Newtown, Obama said he would "use whatever power this office holds" to prevent similar tragedies. By December 17, the White House petition had more than 150,000 signatures, and one week after the shooting it had almost 200,000, along with those on 30 similar petitions.

A USA Today/Gallup poll conducted days after the shooting showed "mixed results" regarding public opinion on firearm laws. While public support for strengthening gun laws rose 15 percent compared to a similar poll in 2011, there had been "little change in attitudes about some longstanding proposals, including the outlawing of assault rifles." A law requiring background checks for all gun-show sales was favored by 92 percent of Americans and a law banning the sale and possession of magazines capable of holding more than 10 rounds) was supported by 62 percent of Americans. A record-high 74 percent opposed a ban on handguns and 51 percent opposed banning assault weapons.

== White House actions ==
On December 19, 2012, President Obama announced the formation of an inter-agency gun-violence task force headed by Vice President Joe Biden. The task force held 22 meetings and collected ideas from 229 organizations.

On January 16, 2013, President Obama announced a plan for reducing gun violence in four parts: closing background check loopholes; banning assault weapons and magazines capable of holding more than 10 rounds; making schools safer; and increasing access to mental health services. The plan included 23 executive actions, signed immediately by the president, and 12 proposals for Congress.

The executive actions signed by President Obama were:

- Issuing a presidential memorandum to require federal agencies to make relevant data available to the National Instant Criminal Background Check System (NICS).
- Addressing unnecessary legal barriers, particularly relating to the Health Insurance Portability and Accountability Act (HIPAA), that may prevent states from making information available to NICS.
- Improving incentives for states to share information with NICS.
- Directing the attorney general to review categories of individuals prohibited from having a gun to make sure dangerous people are not slipping through the cracks.
- Proposing a rule making to give law enforcement authorities the ability to run a full background check on an individual before returning a seized gun.
- Publishing a letter from the Bureau of Alcohol, Tobacco, Firearms and Explosives (ATF) to federally licensed gun dealers providing guidance on how to run background checks for private sellers.
- Starting a national safe and responsible gun ownership campaign.
- Reviewing safety standards for gun locks and gun safes (Consumer Product Safety Commission).
- Issuing a presidential memorandum to require federal law enforcement to trace guns recovered in criminal investigations.
- Releasing a report analyzing information on lost and stolen guns and making it widely available to law enforcement authorities.
- Nominating an ATF director.
- Providing law enforcement authorities, first responders and school officials with proper training for armed attacks situations.
- Maximizing enforcement efforts to prevent gun violence and prosecute gun crime.
- Issuing a presidential memorandum directing the Centers for Disease Control and Prevention (CDC) to research gun violence.
- Directing the attorney general to issue a report on the availability and most effective use of new gun safety technologies and challenging the private sector to develop innovative technologies.
- Clarify that the Affordable Care Act (ACA) does not prohibit doctors asking their patients about guns in their homes.
- Releasing a letter to health care providers clarifying that no federal law prohibits them from reporting threats of violence to law enforcement authorities.
- Providing incentives for schools to hire school resource officers.
- Developing model emergency response plans for schools, houses of worship, and institutions of higher education.
- Releasing a letter to state health officials clarifying the scope of mental health services that Medicaid plans must cover.
- Finalizing regulations clarifying essential health benefits and parity requirements within insurance exchanges.
- Committing to finalizing mental health parity regulations.
- Starting a national dialogue on mental health led by Kathleen Sebelius, the secretary of health and human services, and Arne Duncan, the secretary of education.

The White House's proposed congressional actions were these:

- Requiring criminal background checks for all gun sales, including those by private sellers that currently are exempt.
- Reinstating and strengthening the federal Assault Weapons Ban of 1994 (AWB 1994) that expired in 2004.
- Limiting ammunition magazines to 10 rounds.
- Banning the possession of armor-piercing bullets by anyone other than members of the military and law enforcement.
- Increasing criminal penalties for "straw purchasers" who pass the required background check to buy a gun on behalf of someone else.
- Acting on a $4 billion administration proposal to help keep 15,000 police officers on the street.
- Confirming President Obama's nominee for director of the (ATF).
- Eliminating a restriction that requires the ATF to allow the importation of weapons that are more than 50 years old.
- Financing programs to train more police officers, first responders and school officials on how to respond to active armed attacks.
- Provide additional $20 million to help expand the system that tracks violent deaths across the nation from 18 states to 50 states.
- Providing $30 million in grants to states to help schools develop emergency response plans.
- Providing financing to expand mental health programs for young people.

The proposals were opposed by the NRA and the National Shooting Sports Foundation (NSSF), and opposition was expected by Republican and some Democratic legislators.

== Advocacy groups actions ==
On December 21, 2012 – between the formation of Biden's task force and the announcement of Obama's proposals – Wayne LaPierre, executive vice president of the National Rifle Association (NRA), expressed the gun-rights group's sympathy for the families of Newtown. LaPierre said that gun-free school zones attract killers, and that "the media demonize lawful gun owners, amplify their cries for more laws, and fill the national media with misinformation and dishonest thinking that only delay meaningful action." He said, "The only thing that stops a bad guy with a gun is a good guy with a gun," and that debating legislation that won't work would be a waste of time. He called on Congress "to act immediately to appropriate whatever is necessary to put armed police officers in every single school in this nation" so that every school in America would be safe when pupils returned to school in January 2013. LaPierre announced that the NRA would develop a National Model School Shield Program for every American school that wants it.

After LaPierre's press conference, the Brady Campaign asked for donations to support its gun control advocacy and asked NRA members "who believe like we do, that we are better than this" to join its campaign. On January 8, 2013, former Congresswoman Gabby Giffords, who was shot and injured in a 2011 shooting in Tucson, launched Americans for Responsible Solutions to raise money for gun control efforts to counter the influence of powerful pro-gun groups such as the NRA.

== Congressional action ==
=== Proposed assault weapons ban ===
On January 24, 2013, Senator Dianne Feinstein and 24 Democratic cosponsors introduced S. 150, the Assault Weapons Ban of 2013 (AWB 2013). It was similar to the expired 1994 federal ban, but differed in that it used a one-feature test for a firearm to be considered an assault weapon, rather than the two-feature test of the 1994 ban. Gun-control advocates said the stricter test would make the weapons less appealing to gun enthusiasts. In addition, it would have banned:

- the sale, transfer, importation or manufacture of about 150 named firearms;
- firearms with "thumbhole stocks" and "bullet buttons";
- the importation of assault weapons and large-capacity magazines;
- and large-capacity ammunition feeding devices (defined as those capable of holding more than 10 rounds).

It would have grandfathered in weapons legally owned on the day of enactment and exempted 2,258 specific firearms "used for hunting or sporting purposes," of which only 33 were semiautomatic centerfire rifles.

Feinstein wanted the grandfathered firearms registered under the National Firearms Act, which currently registers machineguns, silencers and short barreled shotguns.

On March 14, 2013, the Senate Judiciary Committee approved the bill, though it was not expected to clear the full Senate or the House. Senate Majority Leader Harry Reid decided to leave the proposed ban out of the broader gun control bill, saying that it was unlikely to win the 60 votes it needed in the 100-member chamber and that it would jeopardize more widely supported proposals. On the morning of April 17, 2013, the bill failed on a vote of 40 to 60. It was supported by Democrat Reid and Republican Senator Mark Kirk, but 15 Democrats, one independent, and all the Republicans except Kirk voted against the ban.

=== Proposed universal background checks ===
The Manchin-Toomey Amendment was a bi-partisan piece of legislation that would require background checks on most private party firearm sales, sponsored by Democratic Sen. Joe Manchin and Republican Sen. Pat Toomey. The amendment, S.Amdt. 715 to S. 649, was voted on and defeated on April 17, 2013, by a vote of 54–46. It needed 60 votes to pass.

== State actions ==
As of April 3, 2013, only five states had passed stricter gun control laws, while ten states had passed laws that weakened restrictions on firearms.

=== Connecticut ===
In the early morning hours of April 4, 2013, the Connecticut General Assembly passed new restrictions to the state's existing assault weapons ban. Governor Dannel Malloy signed them into law later the same day. The law banned the sale or purchase of magazines capable of holding more than ten rounds of ammunition like those used in the Sandy Hook Elementary School shooting, and required universal background checks for all firearm purchases.

Gun owners challenged the law, but federal judge Alfred Covello upheld the law, ruling it constitutional and writing, "While the act burdens the plaintiffs' Second Amendment rights, it is substantially related to the important governmental interest of public safety and crime control." Gun owners said they would appeal.

In February 2014, the Hartford Courant reported that Connecticut had processed about 50,000 assault weapons certificates, but that anywhere from 50,000 to 350,000 remained unregistered. "And that means," wrote the Courant's Dan Haar, "as of Jan. 1, Connecticut has very likely created tens of thousands of newly minted criminals — perhaps 100,000 people, almost certainly at least 20,000 — who have broken no other laws." Frank Miniter wrote in an April 2014 Forbes op-ed "that more than 300,000 Connecticut residents decided not to register their 'assault weapons,' moved them out of state, or sold them."

=== New York ===
In January 2013, New York became the first U.S. state to act after the Sandy Hook Elementary School shooting. The Secure Ammunition and Firearms Enforcement (SAFE) Act passed in the state Senate 43–18 on January 15 and cleared the New York State Assembly after about five hours of debate on Tuesday, January 16. It was signed by Governor Andrew Cuomo one hour later. The act expanded the definition of assault weapons banned in New York, created a state database for pistol permits, reduced the maximum number of rounds legally allowed from 7 to 10, and required universal background checks on all gun sales.

A dozen Republican conference members voted for the measure, but its Senate Republican leader did not attend the signing ceremony. The NRA called the assembly's actions "a secretive end run around the legislative and democratic process ... with no committee hearings and no public input," and said the law was "draconian."

In a related move, the state comptroller announced that the state's pension fund would freeze its investments in publicly traded firearm manufacturers. The fund's holdings in Smith & Wesson had been sold in December, after the Connecticut shootings.

Provisions of the SAFE Act have been challenged. On December 31, 2013, a federal court judge struck down the act's limit of seven rounds in magazines capable of holding 10, but upheld its expanded ban on assault weapons. As of April 2014, that decision was under appeal, and another challenge, that the bill was improperly fast-tracked, was dismissed by a trial-level judge. The plaintiff said that he will take that decision to the New York Court of Appeals.

Non-compliance with this new law has been reported in New York. Frank Miniter wrote in an April 2014 Forbes op-ed that one million residents own "assault weapons" and so called "high-capacity magazines" (which are political terms). He wrote that many had decided to practice civil disobedience and not register their weapons, a class A misdemeanor with a potential sentence of one year in prison. USA Today reported that some owners threatened not to register their weapons, and that some chose to bypass registration by modifying or selling them before the April 15 deadline. State police say they cannot report how many people have registered. By law, they must keep their database of assault weapon owners private.

=== Maryland ===
Late on April 4, 2013, the Maryland General Assembly passed Governor Martin O'Malley's gun control bill, the Firearm Safety Act of 2013. It bans the purchase of 45 types of assault weapons and limits gun magazines to 10 rounds. It requires handgun licensing and fingerprinting for new gun owners and bans those who have been involuntarily committed to a mental health facility from buying a gun.

On November 21, 2023, a three-judge panel in the Fourth Circuit voted 2–1 to strike down the handgun licensing requirement, in light of a 2022 Supreme Court decision broadening the interpretation of the Second Amendment.
