= Mother (advertising agency) =

Creative advertising agency

Mother is an independent global advertising agency founded in London in 1996 by Mark Waites, Stef Calcraft, Libby Brockhoff, and Robert Saville. The agency, which also includes a design division, Mother Design, operates offices in London, New York, Los Angeles, Shanghai, Singapore, and Berlin.

== History ==
Mother was founded around a London kitchen table in 1996 by Mark Waites, Stef Calcraft, Libby Brockhoff, and Robert Saville.

The agency's work includes the early Levi’s Odyssey spoof for Lilt, its celebrity-fronted "Goldspot" cinema adverts for Orange, "Here Come The Girls" for Boots, and the PG Tips campaign featuring Al and Monkey. Recent campaigns include the story of 'Rang-Tan', first with Greenpeace, then Iceland, waking the world up to the devastation caused by dirty palm oil, KFC's 2018 'FCK' apology or its much in demand 'Gravy Candle', and IKEA's 'The Wonderful Everyday' campaign.

In 2025, Mother is one of London's last major independent ad agencies, resisting acquisition and positioning itself as a creative "safe haven" amid industry-wise consolidation and AI-driven disruption.

== Offices ==
Mother moved to its current offices in London's Shoreditch in 2004, designed by Clive Wilkinson architects.

Mother New York was first founded in Hudson Yards, Manhattan and has since relocated to Gowanus, Brooklyn on a 10-year lease between the Lowe's Parking Lot and Gowanus Canal.

== Notable campaigns ==
=== Amnesty International ===
Mother were the lead agency and co-executive producers for The Secret Policeman’s Ball for the fiftieth anniversary of Amnesty International. The show took place in the United States for the first time on March 4, 2012, at Radio City Music Hall in New York City, and featured a mix of prominent comedians from both Britain and the United States. After a taped introduction by Archbishop Desmond Tutu, the live comedy lineup included Jon Stewart, Russell Brand, Eddie Izzard, Ben Stiller, Fred Armisen, Kristen Wiig, David Walliams, Jimmy Carr, Noel Fielding, Matt Berry, Micky Flanagan, Jack Whitehall, Tim Roth, Bill Hader (as Julian Assange), Rex Lee (as Kim Jong-Un), and a cameo appearance by Richard Branson. Liam Neeson also introduced a set from formerly imprisoned Burmese comedian and political activist Zarganar. In between the comedic performances, the music lineup consisted of Mumford & Sons, Reggie Watts, and a concluding set by Coldplay. Additionally, Beavis and Butthead appeared in an animated sequence and former Monty Python members Michael Palin, Eric Idle, and Terry Jones appeared in pre-recorded video segments explaining comedically why they were not there. At several moments in the show, Statler and Waldorf from the Muppets commented on the event and spoke to the performers from one of the balconies. The event was streamed live on Epix, and broadcast on Channel 4 in the UK.

=== Al and Monkey ===
In 2001 Mother created Al and Monkey to promote ITV Digital, a campaign that was named Campaign of the Year by Campaign Magazine. After ITV Digital entered bankruptcy, Mother brought the characters back as the face of PG Tips.

=== Boots ===
In Christmas 2007, Mother created ‘Here Come The Girls’ for Boots. The award-winning campaign has continued and evolved into the current campaign of comedy vignettes.

=== Coca-Cola 'Move to the Beat' ===
Mother were the creative agency that created Coca-Cola’s global campaign ‘Move to the Beat’ for the 2012 Olympic Games. Featuring Mark Ronson and singer Katy B, the campaign features the new Coca-Cola anthem for the Olympic Games ‘Anywhere in the World’ which uses the sounds of music, sport, and Coca-Cola to create a unique rhythmic beat. Ronson used innovative recording techniques as he traveled the world to capture the sounds of the Coca-Cola Move to the Beat athletes– five Olympic hopefuls chosen for their sporting prowess and inspirational stories: GB table tennis player Darius Knight; US hurdler David Oliver; Russian sprinter Kseniya Vdovina; Singapore archer Dayyan Jaffar, and Mexican taekwondo martial artist María del Rosario Espinoza. A documentary showing Ronson traveling around the world capturing the sound of sport was aired on Channel 4 in the UK.

=== Missing Sounds Of New York ===
Missing Sounds of New York is an album made by The New York Public Library, released on 1 May 2020 through advertising agency Mother New York. The album was recorded during the 2020 COVID-19 quarantine period in New York City. It includes original and archived audio to replicate the sounds of New York City prior to lockdown.

The album was launched on Spotify and SoundCloud. To date the album has garnered more than 350,000 streams online.

=== Pablo the Drug Mule Dog ===
Mother worked with the COI's drugs awareness brief resulting in Mother re-branding the National Drugs Helpline as "FRANK". The FRANK campaign also included the creation of Pablo the Drug Mule Dog voiced by David Mitchell of ‘Mitchell and Webb’. The campaign won the Best of Show award at the IPA Best of Health Awards 2009.

=== Pimm's O'Clock ===
Mother created the "Pimm’s O’Clock" series of adverts featuring Harry Fitzgibbon Simms, ambassador for Pimm's. Harry’s character is played by Alexander Armstrong from the popular comedy duo Armstrong and Miller.

=== Orange Gold Spots ===
Mother London worked on the Orange Gold spot campaign from 2003 to 2009. Amongst many notable film stars, the campaign featured Snoop Dogg, Patrick Swayze, Verne Troyer, Rob Lowe, Rob Schneider, and Anjelica Huston.

=== Stella Artois ===
Mother has been the creative agency for Stella Artois since 2008, working on the main line as well as Stella Artois 4%, Stella Artois Black, and Stella Artois Cidre. The work for the brand, set in the 1960s French Riviera, has won numerous awards both creatively and strategically. In 2011, Stella Artois was chosen as Advertiser of the Year by Campaign magazine.

=== DEVO ===
In 2010, the 1980s new-wave group DEVO and Warner Bros. Records hired Mother to help rebrand and develop content for the band for their first new album in 20 years, Something For Everybody. The campaign revolved around a series of videos and microsites touting the band's desire to create the most commercially viable product through focus group testing, online voting, and even opening a fictional new office called Mother LA in Los Angeles. The campaign culminated in a livestreamed listening party, during which the record was played for a room full of cats.
