= Harry Lees (Australian footballer) =

Australian rules footballer

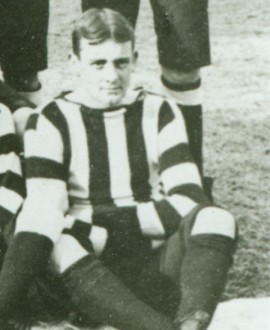
- Lees in 1908

Personal information
- Full name: Harry Lees
- Born: 28 April 1890; Ashton-under-Lyne, England
- Died: 9 September 1964 (aged 74); Thornbury, Victoria
- Original teams: Foy & Gibsons
- Height: 170 cm (5 ft 7 in)
- Weight: 62 kg (137 lb)

Playing career^{1}
Years	Club	Games (Goals)
1908	Collingwood	1 (0)
- ^{1} Playing statistics correct to the end of 1908.

Harry Lees (28 April 1890 – 9 September 1964) was an Australian rules footballer who played with Collingwood in the Victorian Football League (VFL).
