= Anomaly (advertising agency) =

American advertising agency

- Industry: Advertising; Media; Marketing
- Founded: 2004
- Website: anomaly.com

Anomaly is an advertising agency based in New York City.

== History ==
Anomaly was founded in 2004 by Jason DeLand, Carl Johnson, and several partners, including Mike Byrne, Justin Barocas and Johnny Vulkan with a goal to integrate advertising more widely across various media. It has been regarded as one of the best agencies in the world by AdAge, Adweek and Fast Company. They have offices in Los Angeles, New York, Toronto, London, Berlin, and Shanghai.

== Notable clients ==
Anomaly's clients include:

- AB InBev
- Abbott
- Ancestry.com
- Ally Financial
- Cancer Research UK
- Carnival Cruise
- The Coca-Cola Company
- Denny's
- Diageo
- Dick's Sporting Goods
- Facebook
- General Mills
- Google
- Grenfell United
- Hotels.com
- Jimmy John's
- L'Occitane en Provence
- LVMH
- MasterClass
- MINI
- NBA2K
- NBC's Peacock
- Nespresso
- New York Life Insurance
- Uber
- Unilever
- Vroom
- YouTube
- Zalando

== Recognition ==
Anomaly was named Adweek’s 2022 US Agency of the Year and Ad Age's 2017 Agency of the Year.

Anomaly has been featured on Fast Company's “World’s Most Innovative Companies” in 2008, 2014, and 2020, honored as one of Time Magazine's Best Inventions of 2016 for dosist (a medicinal cannabis brand the agency created), and was named #2 on LinkedIn's Top 50 Best Startups to work at in 2019.

Additionally, Anomaly has been recognized at the Cannes Lions International Festival of Creativity, Effies, Jay Chiat, Digiday Awards, and the Mashies. Anomaly has won two Emmy Awards for Avec Eric, a cooking show starring Eric Ripert, chef of renowned seafood restaurant Le Bernardin.
