= Hungry Man Productions =

Marketing company

- Industry: Commercial marketing Commercial production
- Founded: 1997; 29 years ago
- Founders: Bryan Buckley, Hank Perlman
- Headquarters: New York City, United States
- Website: hungryman.com

Hungry Man Productions is an international commercial marketing and production company. The organization has been voted by Creativity Online to be one of the top five commercial production companies in the world. It is also the only production company to be ranked within the top ten at the Cannes Advertising Festival's Palme d'Or for over ten consecutive years. The organization has created well over 50 Super Bowl commercials over a ten-year period.

== History ==
Hungry Man Productions was started in 1997, by Hank Perlman and Bryan Buckley. The pair first collaborated on ESPN's "This is SportsCenter" campaign, which was named as one of the Top 10 Commercial Campaigns of the 20th century by TV Guide. The campaign was originally created by Perlman and directed by Buckley (along with Frank Todaro). As of 2012, the organization is headquartered in New York City and has additional offices in Los Angeles, São Paulo, Rio de Janeiro, and London.
