= Harry Lee (shell collector) =

American shell collector (died 2024)

Harry G. Lee was an American shell collector and physician. Over the course of his life, Lee named 36 species of Mollusca and has had 18 others named for him. He was considered one of the top amateur experts in the field of mollusks. He donated his extensive collection, one of the world's largest, to the Florida Museum of Natural History at the University of Florida.

Lee attended Millburn High School, Williams College, and Weill Cornell Medicine. He started his medical career in 1974 and practiced internal medicine for 31 years.

Lee lived in Florida and was married with three children. He died on January 8, 2024, at the age of 83 after suffering a stroke a month earlier.

== Selected publications ==
- Lee, Harry G. (2009). Marine shells of northeast Florida. Jacksonville Beach, Florida: Jacksonville Shell Club. ISBN 978-0-9671254-0-4. OCLC 434869184.
- Lyons, William G., and Harry G. Lee. "Fasciolaria gigantea Kiener, 1840 (currently Triplofusus giganteus; Mollusca, Gastropoda, Fasciolariidae): the correct name for the horse conch of the southeastern United States and Mexico." The Bulletin of Zoological Nomenclature 75, no. 1 (2018): 195–203.
- Lee, Harry G. "Genera of American Strombid Gastropods (Gastropoda: Strombidae) and Remarks on Their Phylogený." Veliger 49, no. 4 (2007): 256–264.
- Lee, Harry G. "Partulid snails, their collectors, and a prodigious dynasty of French naturalists." American Conchologist 40, no. 1 (2012): 10–19.
- Lee, Harry G. "Shelled land snails of the Calusa shell mound, Ding Darling National Wildlife Refuge, Sanibel Island, and of Lee County, Florida." Florida Scientist (2014): 2–14.
