= Harry David Lee =

American businessman

Henry David Lee (December 9, 1849 – March 15, 1928) was the founder of the HD Lee Mercantile Company, inventors of Lee Jeans.

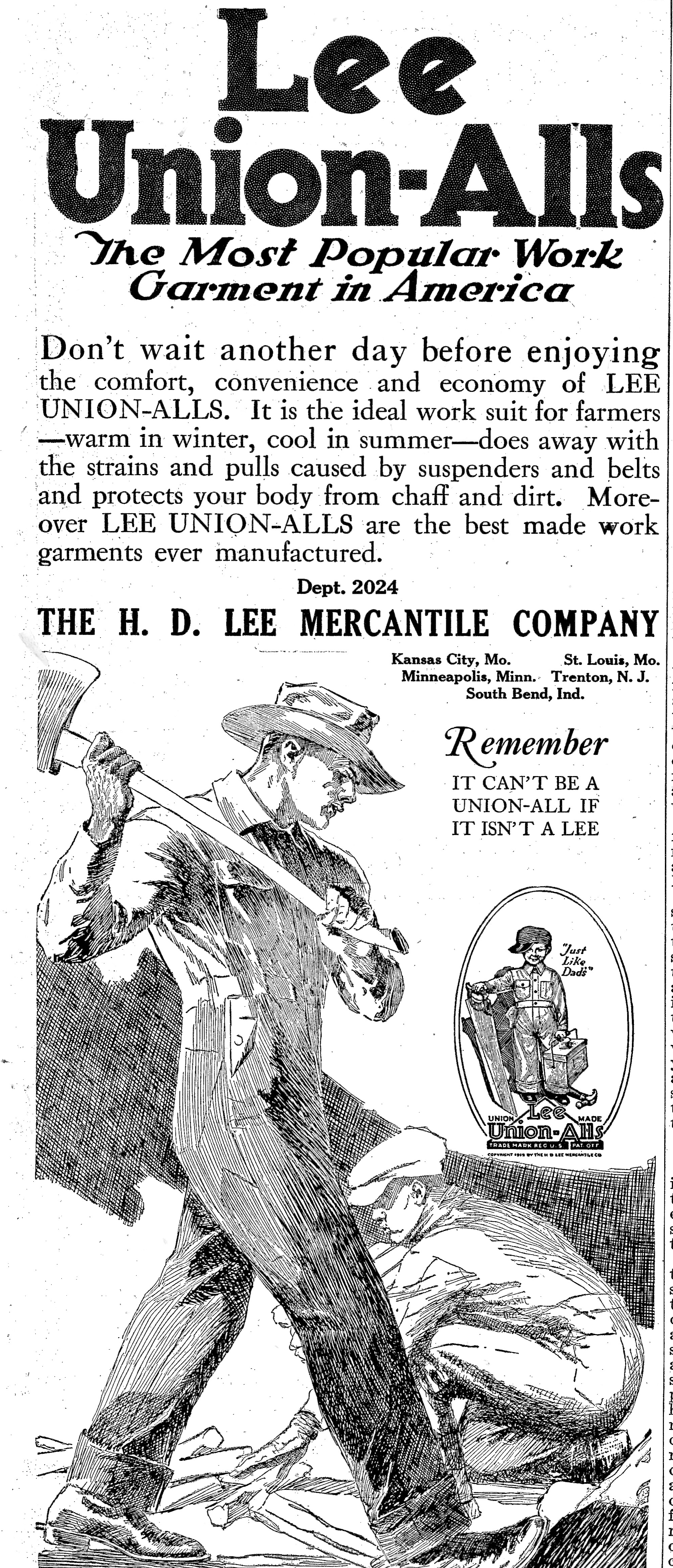
A Lee Union-Alls advertisement

== Early life ==
Lee was born in 1849 in Vermont and attended school in South East Randolph, he moved to Galion, Ohio, in 1867 where he worked as a hotel clerk and parlayed early business success selling circular knitting machines into the purchase of Central Oil Co. of Galion. Later the Standard Oil Company purchased the refinery and he remained for a time as president. He then retired, having accumulated a fortune in his thirties.

That early success in the oil industry coupled with advice from his doctor (he was tubercular) to move to a drier climate, led Lee to move to Salina, Kansas in 1889 and set up The H.D. Lee Mercantile Co., soon becoming the major food distributor between Kansas City and Denver. Later the product range was expanded to include sales of notions, furnishings, stationery and school supplies. In 1912, The H.D. Lee Mercantile Co. opened its first garment factory making work wear and hence the Lee Jeans brand was born.
