= Apple Inc. advertising =

Apple Inc. has had many notable advertisements since the 1980s. The "1984" Super Bowl commercial introduced the original Macintosh mimicking imagery from George Orwell's 1984. The 1990s Think Different campaign linked Apple to famous social figures such as John Lennon and Mahatma Gandhi, while also introducing "Think Different" as a new slogan for the company. Other popular advertising campaigns include the 2000s "iPod People", the 2002 Switch campaign, and most recently the Get a Mac campaign which ran from 2006 to 2009.

While Apple's advertisements have been mostly successful, they have also been met with controversy from consumers, artists and other corporations. For instance, the "iPod People" campaign was criticized for copying a campaign from a shoe company called Lugz. Another instance was when photographer Louie Psihoyos filed suit against Apple for using his "wall of videos" imagery to advertise for Apple TV without his consent.

== 1980–1985 ==
Page 1 of the 1983 "Macintosh Introduction" brochure published in Newsweek magazine

A "Macintosh Introduction" 18-page brochure was included with various magazines in December 1983, often remembered because Bill Gates was featured on page 11. For a special post-election edition of Newsweek in November 1984, Apple spent more than $2.5 million to buy all of the advertising pages in the issue (a total of 39).

Apple also ran a "Test Drive a Macintosh" promotion that year, in which potential buyers with a credit card could try a Macintosh for 24 hours and return it to a dealer afterwards.

One ad contrasted the original Macintosh and its simple user brochure to the IBM Personal Computer with its stacks of complicated manuals.

=== "1984" television commercial: launching the Macintosh ===
"1984" (directed by Ridley Scott) is the title of the television commercial that launched the Macintosh personal computer in the United States, in January 1984.

The commercial was first aired nationally on January 22, 1984, during a break in the third quarter of Super Bowl XVIII. The ad showed an unnamed heroine (played by Anya Major) wearing orange shorts, red running shoes, and a white tank top with a Picasso-style picture of Apple's Macintosh computer, running through an Orwellian world to throw a sledgehammer at a TV image of Big Brother — an implied representation of IBM played by David Graham.

The concluding screen showed the message and voice over "On January 24th, Apple Computer will introduce Macintosh. And you'll see why 1984 won't be like '1984'." At the end, the "rainbow bitten" Apple logo is shown on a black background.

== 1985–1990 ==
In 1985 the "Lemmings" commercial aired at the Super Bowl, a significant failure compared to the popular "1984."

Two years later, Apple released a short film titled Pencil Test to showcase the Macintosh II's animation capabilities.

== 1990–1995 ==
When Apple let the Mac become a religious issue more than a tool, the consequence was high visibility and a lot of great press — but also a limited market.

— Gordon Eubanks (1994)

In the 1990s, Apple launched the "What's on your PowerBook?" campaign. Print ads and television commercials featured celebrities describing how the PowerBook helped them in their businesses and everyday lives.

During 1995, Apple ran an infomercial called "The Martinetti's Bring Home a Computer" to sell Macintosh computers and promote its Performa line. The infomercial followed the fictional Martinetti family as they brought home their first computer and attempted to convince the father of the family to keep the computer by using it for various educational, business and other household purposes.

In the 1990s, Apple launched "Power" advertisements for its Power Macintosh.

Apple also responded to the introduction of Windows 95 with print ads and a television commercial.

== 1995–2000 ==
=== "Think Different" ===
"Think Different" was an advertising slogan created by the New York branch office of advertising agency TBWA\Chiat\Day for Apple Computer during the late 1990s. It was used in a famous television commercial and several print advertisements. The slogan was used at the end of several product commercials, until the advent of Apple's Switch ad campaign. Apple no longer uses the slogan; its commercials usually end with a silhouetted Apple logo and sometimes a pertinent website address.

==== Television commercials ====
Significantly shortened versions of the text were used in two television commercials titled "Crazy Ones".

The one-minute commercial featured black and white video footage of significant historical people of the past, including (in order) Albert Einstein, Bob Dylan, Martin Luther King Jr., Richard Branson, John Lennon, R. Buckminster Fuller, Thomas Edison, Muhammad Ali, Ted Turner, Maria Callas, Mahatma Gandhi, Amelia Earhart, Alfred Hitchcock, Martha Graham, Jim Henson (with Kermit the Frog), Frank Lloyd Wright, and Picasso.

The thirty-second commercial used many of the same people, but closed with Jerry Seinfeld, instead of the young girl. In order, they were: Albert Einstein, Bob Dylan, Martin Luther King Jr., John Lennon, Martha Graham, Muhammad Ali, Alfred Hitchcock, Mahatma Gandhi, Jim Henson, Maria Callas, Picasso, and Jerry Seinfeld.

==== Print advertisements ====
Print advertisements from the campaign were published in many mainstream magazines such as Newsweek and Time. These were often traditional advertisements, prominently featuring the company's computers or consumer electronics along with the slogan. However, there was also another series of print ads which were more focused on Apple's brand image than specific products. They featured a portrait of one of the historic figures shown in the television ad, with a small Apple logo and the words "Think Different" in one corner (with no reference to the company's products).

== 2001–present ==
=== "Switch" ===
"Switch" was an advertising campaign launched by Apple on June 10, 2002. "The Switcher" was a term conjured by Apple, it refers to a person who changes from using the Microsoft Windows platform to the Mac. These ads featured what the company referred to as "real people" who had "switched". An international television and print ad campaign directed users to a website where various myths about the Mac platform were dispelled.

=== iPod ===
Apple has promoted the iPod and iTunes with several advertising campaigns, particularly with their silhouette commercials used both in print and on TV. These commercials feature people as dark silhouettes, dancing to music against bright-colored backgrounds. The silhouettes hold their iPods which are shown in distinctive white. The TV advertisements have used a variety of songs from both mainstream and relatively unknown artists, whilst some commercials have featured silhouettes of specific artists including Bob Dylan, U2, Eminem, Jet, The Ting Tings, Yael Naïm, CSS, Caesars, and Wynton Marsalis.

Successive TV commercials have also used increasingly complex animation. Newer techniques include the use of textured backgrounds, 3D arenas, and photo-realistic lighting on silhouette characters. The "Completely Remastered" ads (for the 2nd generation iPod nano) have a different design, in which the background is completely black.

The colored iPod nanos shine light and glow, showing some of the dancers, holding the iPod nanos while a luminescent light trail made by moving iPod nanos. This is to display the fact that the 2nd generation iPod nanos are colored. The silhouette commercials are a family of commercials in a similar style that form part of the advertising campaign to promote the iPod, Apple's portable digital music player.

=== "Get a Mac" ===
The two characters from the ads who personify a Windows PC (left, John Hodgman) and a Mac PC (Justin Long)

In 2006, Apple released a series of twenty-four "I'm a Mac, I'm a PC" advertisements as part of their "Get a Mac" campaign. The campaign officially ended in 2010 due to the introduction of the iPad.

The ads, which are directed by Phil Morrison, star actor Justin Long (Accepted) and author and humorist John Hodgman (The Daily Show) as a Macintosh (Mac) computer and a Windows PC, respectively.

Since the launch of the original ads, similar commercials have appeared in Japan and the UK. While they use the same form and music as the American ads, the actors are specific to those countries.

The UK ads feature famous comedy duo Mitchell and Webb, with David Mitchell as the Windows PC and Robert Webb as the Mac computer. The Japanese ones are played by Rahmens, with Jin Katagiri as the Windows PC and Kentarō Kobayashi as the Mac computer.

In April 2009, Justin Long revealed that the "Get A Mac" commercials "might be done". In May 2010, the "Get A Mac" was officially ended and the web pages began to redirect to a new "Why You'll Love Mac" page with more features on the Macintosh hardware and software.

=== Genius ads ===
Apple debuted a new series of ads produced by TBWA\Media Arts Lab during television broadcasts of the 2012 Summer Olympics opening ceremony. The ads portrayed people in everyday situations being assisted by an employee from the company's Genius Bars. The ads were widely criticized, with some, including former TBWA\Chiat\Day creative director Ken Segall remarking that it portrayed Apple customers as clueless.

=== iPhone Ads ===
Apple has aired many advertisements promoting the different models of the iPhone since its initial release in 2007. This company is well known for their advertisements and marketing strategy. Apple segments its customer base by using behavioral, demographic, and psychographic factors. Within their iPhone advertising, Apple has made it a point to highlight the key features that their phone has to offer. Apple highlights claimed superior performance, camera quality, privacy and several other factors that they say set their product apart. Apple aims to win over the majority of smartphone users by showing customers the great features the iPhone has to offer. One way Apple does this is by sending ordinary users out into the world to capture pictures and videos. The ads show how the camera feature works and claim that such pictures can be taken by anyone, as long as it is only on an iPhone, not other brand's phones.

A second strategy Apple has is comparing their product with rival products in their advertisements. Ads that show the relative advantage the iPhone has over competitor products. They focus on potential switchers who currently are using another smartphone brand. The iPhone advertising campaign took flight in 2007 and has continued into 2019.

Apple released the first advertisement for the iPhone in February 2007 during the national broadcast of the Academy Awards. The 30-second commercial featured cuts of famous figures answering their telephones, all saying "Hello". As it progressed, the ad showed more recent versions of the telephone; it ended with a preview of the first generation iPhone to draw a connection between the iPhone. Other features included in those advertisements were email, camera, and general touchscreen capabilities.

In September 2016, the "Don't Blink" web video campaign was launched, which described the new Apple product line in 107 seconds with fast typography. It has since gone on to become an often-used video template on social media.

=== Apple Music Ads ===
Apple Music ads have had a theme throughout recent years. Apple uses celebrities, like dancers and singers to star in their Apple Music commercials along with their ear bud commercials starring dancer like Lil Buck. In 2016, Taylor Swift released her new Apple Music ad that featured a Drake song. Not only was this successful for Apple because of the humor of the plot line, but it spurred a 431% jump in sales for Drake.

=== "Crush!" ===
External videos
- Crush! | iPad Pro | Apple at the Wayback Machine (archived May 6, 2025)

On May 7, 2024, Apple released an advertisement called "Crush!" for the iPad Pro, featuring a variety of instruments and art supplies, such as an arcade cabinet, piano, and paints, being destroyed by a hydraulic press and symbolically compressed into an iPad Pro, with the song "All I Ever Need Is You" by Sonny & Cher as background music.

The advertisement received broad criticism online, with Hugh Grant describing the advertisement as a "destruction of the human experience". On May 9, 2024, Tor Myhren, Apple's VP of marketing communications, issued an apology for the advertisement, stating "Creativity is in our DNA at Apple, and it's incredibly important to us to design products that empower creatives all over the world. Our goal is to always celebrate the myriad of ways users express themselves and bring their ideas to life through iPad. We missed the mark with this video, and we're sorry ".

== Criticism ==
Apple's advertising has come under criticism for adapting other creative works as advertisements and for inaccurate depictions of product functionality.

Some artists and unrelated businesses have complained that Apple's advertisements use their ideas. A 2005 iPod campaign starring rapper Eminem, called "Detroit", was criticized for being too similar to a 2002 advertisement for Lugz boots. A 2006 television advertisement was made by a director who had also made music videos for an American band, and the ad was criticized for being too similar to the music videos. Artist Christian Marclay denied Apple the rights to his 1995 short film "Telephones" to market Apple's iPhone, but Apple ran an ad during the 2007 Academy Awards broadcast that "seems like a tribute" to Marclay's experimental film. In July 2007, Colorado-based photographer Louie Psihoyos filed suit against Apple for using his "wall of videos" imagery to advertise for Apple TV. Apple had allegedly been negotiating with Psihoyos for rights to the imagery, but backed out and used similar imagery anyway. Psyhoyos later dropped the lawsuit. Generally, copyright law prohibits copying specific expressions, but does not prohibit adapting ideas for other purposes, including as a tribute through allusions to works created by the honored artist.

In August 2008, the Advertising Standards Authority (ASA) in the UK banned one iPhone ad from further broadcast in its original form due to "misleading claims". The ASA took issue with the ads' claim that "all parts of the internet are on the iPhone", when the device did not support Java or Adobe's third-party Flash web browser plug-in. The newer iPhone ads presented a "Sequence Shortened" caption at the beginning.

In 2012 Apple was sued in Australia for branding its 2012 iPad as being 4G capable, even though the iPad was not compatible with Australia's 4G network. Apple offered a refund to customers for all iPads sold in Australia. Apple Inc. agreed to pay a A$2.25 million penalty for misleading Australian customers about its iPad being 4G capable.
