= Timeline of Steve Jobs media =

Steve Jobs (February 24, 1955 – October 5, 2011) appeared in numerous speaking engagements, interviews, media appearances, and product introductions throughout his life. He spoke about a vast array of subjects including technology, entrepreneurship, society, philosophy, education, communication, movies, music, television, role models, industry, etc.

== Interviews, appearances, and speaking engagements ==
| Year | City | Occasion | Media | Subject Matter |
|---|---|---|---|---|
| 1980 | | Presentation donated to Computer History Museum | Video | Tools to amplify human ability. Computer is a bicycle for the mind; VisiCalc; Early word processors; Computing in education; Ease of use; Ratio of computers to users; Interactive software; Interactive video; The future of Apple Computer; Computing power applied to ease of use; Origin of Apple Computer name; Differences between hardware and software; Obsolescence; 500 employees; Sales dollars per employee; Maintaining creativity in the long term |
| 1980 | Cork, Ireland | RTÉ Interview | Video | Personal computers will be used in homes, businesses and education.; Apple II on the Space Shuttle |
| 1981 | Cupertino, CA | ABC 20/20 interview by Bob Brown at Apple offices 2/18/1981 | Video (YouTube); Video (Archive.org) | |
| 1981 | San Francisco, CA | CBS Evening News; Barry Petersen interview | Video (YouTube); Video (Archive.org) | Life is seducing you into learning calculators, ATMs, and now desktop computers; It is not a Nineteen Eighty-Four-ish vision; It's going to be very gradual and very human |
| 1981 | | Nightline; Ted Koppel | Video | Invasion of privacy; Computer literacy; Children learning to use computers |
| 1981 | Cupertino, CA | ABC News; Ken Kashiwahara | Video (ABC News); Video (YouTube) | Silicon Valley's entrepreneurial risk culture; "The penalty for failure, for going and trying to start a company in this Valley is nonexistent. There really isn't a penalty for failure either psychologically or economically in the sense that, if you have a good idea and you go out to start your own company, even if you fail, you're generally considered worth more to the company you left because you've gained all this valuable experience, in many disciplines." |
| 1982 | | Academy of Achievement | Audio (YouTube) | Money does not define success; To be intelligent is to have a bird's eye view of the city while others are navigating the streets below.; The key to making connections that lead to innovation is to have a collection of out of the ordinary experiences to draw from.; Bright people are corralled onto a beaten path. Consider alternative paths.; Visit a third world country; Fall in love with two people at once; Walt Disney took LSD once and that's where the idea for Fantasia came from.; A variety of experiences will enable unique solutions.; Don't walk by a Zen Buddhist, buy him lunch.; The people that run the world aren't that different from you; The most ecstatic feeling is to give back to the pool of human innovation which we have all benefited from.; You inherit the responsibility to be a guardian of the earth. |
| 1982 | Boston, MA | Applefest | Audio (SoundCloud) | Steve Wozniak speaks about software protection; It's impossible to protect software.; Computer architecture requires that software is insecurely loaded into memory, enabling it to be copied out of memory.; Apple Computer consulted Martin Hellman and Ron Rivest cryptographers.; The issue of software protection goes away when economic and convenience demands are satisfied.; Growth of the computer marketplace will create competitive pressure on software prices.; Software distribution will transition from retail stores to electronic distribution "over telephone lines", improving convenience.; Similar issues exist with bootlegging in the record (music) industry and shoplifting in retail.; Consumers end up paying higher prices for sales lost to piracy. |
| 1983 | California | NBC Interview with Steve Jobs. | Video | The Personal Office System Market is a major new market and Apple will approach it in a step by step approach to ensure high-quality customer support and feedback.; To avoid adding complex specialized keys in the keyboard, the mouse allows the user to navigate the Graphical User Interface (GUI), eliminating the vast knowledge needed to use the computer. |
| 1983 | Aspen, Colorado | International Design Conference in Aspen (IDCA) - Apple Lisa Presentation Keynote | Video | The way computers have been built in the past won't work in the future anymore. Studies of new architectures are needed.; A lot of people are studying how the human brain architecture works to eventually emulate it with a computer.; The Artificial Intelligence community is researching self-consciousness and whether a computer can ever be self-conscious.; The Apple Lisa Personal Computer is designed for the office marketplace, but its technology will be refined for use in future consumer products; Lisa's productivity enhancement doesn't come from its performance, but from the ease of use of its Graphical User Interface (GUI). |
| 1983 | Aspen, Colorado | International Design Conference in Aspen (IDCA) - 'The Future Isn't What It Used To Be' keynote | Video (YouTube); Audio (Soundcloud); Audio (Archive.org) | Computers are only 36 years old; Kids growing up now will be part of the computer generation; Computers are simple, adaptive, and fast; The oldest person with a degree in Computer Science is 39; Computers are very fast. They run a million instructions per second; Programmers build a collection of low level instructions into higher level instructions; Early electric motors of the late 1890s initially were large thus were applied to large scale applications. They didn't proliferate quickly; Later electric motors drove a shaft through a factory to empower multiple workstations simultaneously; The fractional horsepower electric motor was a breakthrough because it was applied to small individual applications; There are approximately 55 fractional horsepower motors in every household; The history of computers parallels the history of electric motors; ENIAC the first computer, was giant, hardly anyone got a chance to use it; A 1960s computing breakthrough was Time-sharing. Many people could share a large computer e.g. on a college campus; "The reason Apple exists is because we stumbled on to the fractional horsepower computer 5 years before anybody else."; "We made a computer that was about 13 pounds"; The first PC was invented in 1976. In 1983 the industry will ship 3 million personal computers; By 1986, we will ship more computers than automobiles in the USA; "...I need your help. If you've looked at computers, they all look like garbage. All of the great product designers are off designing automobiles/buildings but hardly any of them are designing computers."; The industry will sell 10 million computers whether they look ugly or great because people are going to be spellbound/elated; "It doesn't cost any more money to make it look great"; They are going to be these new objects that are going to be in everyone's working environment, educational environment, and home environment; "We have a shot at putting a great object there (work, school, home) and if we don't, we are going to put one more piece of junk object there"; By 1986 people will be spending two or three hours a day interacting with computers; Industrial design, the software design should be given the same consideration that we give automobiles if not a lot more; "Most of the objects of our life are not designed in America. We've blown it"; "Computers and society are out on a first date in the 80s."; "We have a chance to make these things beautiful. We have a chance to communicate something through the design of the objects themselves."; Apple alone will spend over 100 million dollars over the next 12 months on media advertising. IBM will spend at least that amount; The personal computer is a new medium of communication. One of the media. e.g. books, radio, television, newspapers; Computer communication is different from other mediums. Telephone demands both parties of a conversation be simultaneously present. Computers do not have this requirement.; "One of these days when we have portable computers with radio links, they can be walking around Aspen and retrieve it. (e-mail)"; "The process of communication changes as the mediums evolve."; When a new media emerges, we tend to fall back into old media habits; The first TV shows are basically radio shows with a television camera pointed at them; It took the better part of the 1950s for television to come 'into its own' as a medium; John F. Kennedy funeral television broadcast gave people a level of intensity that would not have been possible with radio; The Apollo program landing. That experience was not possible with the previous medium; It took 20 years for television to evolve away from radio; "Optical video discs" (Laserdisc) can store 55 thousand images on a side, or an hour of video randomly accessible. What are we using it for? Movies. We're dropping back into old media habits."; 5 to 10 years from now, random access storage will 'come into its own'; 1979 MIT experiment, Aspen Movie Map. A precursor of Google Street View is stored on laserdisc and reveals that random access storage will differentiate itself from other media; We are still running historic applications on personal computers e.g. business accounting, COBOL; Apple Lisa enables a person with little talent to draw artistic pictures, transmit them via e-mail; Computer programs are an idea expressed on paper. They enable thousands of individual experiences based on one set of underlying principles; Hamurabi video game. 7 year old kids are playing with a macro economic model. Interactive learning; Books were a way to learn without an intermediary teacher. "The problem was, you can't ask Aristotle a question."; Maybe in the next 50 to 100 years we will enable computer to capture an individual's underlying spirit, set of principles, world so that after they are gone we can ask the computer a question and receive an answer consistent with that individual; Ultimately computers are going to be used for communication and over the next 5 years the standards for interconnecting computers are going to evolve. They all speak different languages right now.; Early Xerox PARC local area network list server revealed special interest groups in the office. Soon there were more interest groups than there were employees.; As computers are networked (on the internet), they will facilitate the creation of special interest groups and bring together the people in those groups. (Social Networking); Office local area network are about 5 years away; Home local area network are about 10 to 15 years away; "We want to put an incredibly great computer in a book that you can carry around with you, that you can learn how to use in 20 minutes. That's what we want to do. And we want to do it this decade. And we really want to do it with a radio link in it so that you dont have to hook up to anything. So you are in communication with all of these larger databases and other computers."; Apple sets out "To design the computer that we want to put into the book eventually even though we cannot put it into the book now and it's called Lisa."; Apple Lisa is sold out for the first year; Eventually we will get to the point where people can create images as good as any other way.; Apple is injecting liberal arts into the computers, adding proportionally spaced fonts, multiple fonts and graphics.; There’s a lot of information in the world, but no tools to take that information and make it useful.; People are more concerned with the privacy of Electric Funds Transfer than the privacy of giant databases.; Apple’s “Kids Can’t Wait” program gives a computer to every school in America.; "Over half of the gross national product is contributed by companies and people that are already in the information business today."; Free sampling service for software as there is for the record industry.; Using telephone lines to transmit the data that composes the software, to offer a free trial period; Educating people on what a computer is and what can it do.; Making software with minimal programming input from the user to make computers easier to use.; Anyone could make a software program that brings a $2.5 million profit with less than $10,000 of computer equipment.; The turnover at Apple has been under 5% since inception.; Everyone at Apple owns stock.; Apple doesn't have unions.; "We feel that for some crazy reason, we’re in the right place at the right time to put something back."; Apple hires people that are better than the current job needed and are independent.; Apple has three layers of management.; "We gambled the company on Lisa."; People from other companies come to Apple because they can work on risky projects that their previous company would avoid. |
| 1983 | Aspen, Colorado | International Design Conference in Aspen (IDCA) - Informal Q&A Session. | Video | |
| 1983 | Honolulu, Hawaii | Apple Sales meeting at Sheraton Waikiki Hotel. | Video (YouTube); Video (Archive.org) | In 1958 IBM fails to buy Xerox; 1968 IBM dismisses the DEC minicomputer as too small; 1977 Apple invents the Apple II, the first personal computer; IBM dismisses the personal computer as too small; 1981 Apple II is the world's most popular computer; Apple grows to a $300 million corporation, fastest growing corporation in American history; November 1981 IBM introduces the IBM PC; 1983 Apple and IBM computer industry's strongest competitors; 1983 Apple and IBM each sell $1 billion in personal computers; First major computer firm goes bankrupt. Total computer industry losses are larger than combined profits of Apple and IBM; 1984 Apple and IBM each invest $50 million in R&D; 1984 Apple and IBM each invest $50 million in TV advertising; 1984 computer dealers fear an IBM dominated marketplace; Was George Orwell right about 1984?; First presentation of the '1984' TV advertisement; Advertisement will run one week before Macintosh is introduced; Jay Chiat the principle of Chiat Day is in the audience; Lee Clow and Steve Hayden (wrote the ad copy) are in the audience; Steve Jobs invites Mitch Kapor, Fred Gibbons and Bill Gates to the "Macintosh Software Dating Game".; Gates: "Microsoft expects to get half of its revenues from Macintosh Software".; Gates says Macintosh will be the third industry standard.; Gates says an ideal relationship with Apple is one where Microsoft independently sells the software and Apple ships computers in a short time. |
| 1984 | Cupertino, CA. | Annual Shareholders Meeting at Flint Center. | Video | |
| 1984 | Boston | Boston Computer Society | Video | |
| 1984 | Cupertino, CA | Interview with Michael Moritz | Video | It takes more patience and perseverance to make something "really great." |
| 1985 | Cupertino, CA. | 1985 Annual Shareholders Meeting at Flint Center. | Video | Jobs receives a letter from a six and a half year old that sums up what Apple has accomplished. The letter explains: this kid was doing a puzzle with the clue "As American as Apple blank?" he incorrectly answered computer instead of pie.; Jobs says it's going to take two years for Apple to enter the office marketplace.; On this day, starts an alternative to IBM's vision of the office: "an alternative that starts with people rather than mainframes." |
| 1985 | | Playboy Magazine Interview | Transcript 1; Transcript 2 | Wealth; Idealism of the 1960s; Petrochemical Revolution brought free mechanical energy; Information Revolution brought free intellectual energy; Users don't need to understand the principles of a machine; Socratic education; "The most compelling reason for most people to buy a computer for the home will be to link it into a nationwide communications network."; Alexander Graham Bell; Telegraph took 40 hours to learn; Macintosh hardware took more than two years to design; Good PR educates people; Apple and IBM as computing standards; Merging of the telephone and the personal computer; Apple's roots are selling to people not Fortune 500s; Strategic mistakes of the Lisa computer division; Jobs was inexperienced at running a company; Sorrow over internal disagreements about the vision; The Macintosh represents Jobs's unrealized vision for the Lisa: a computer for people not corporations; 'Insanely great' people make 'insanely great' products for themselves, to their own highest standard; The Macintosh group wanted to build the greatest computer that has ever been seen; The IBM PC group lacked pride in their product and were motivated by money; Average age of Apple employees is 29; Most people in their 30s and 40s get stuck in their thought processes with rare exceptions; "Companies, as they grow to become multibillion-dollar entities, somehow lose their vision. They insert lots of layers of middle management between the people running the company and the people doing the work."; "Apple is an Ellis Island company. Apple is built on refugees from other companies. These are the extremely bright individual contributors who were troublemakers at other companies."; Dr. Edwin Land (founder of Polaroid) saw the intersection of art and science and business and built an organization to reflect that; "...Dr. Land one of those brilliant troublemakers, was asked to leave his own company‐‑which is one of the dumbest things I’ve ever heard of."; A visionary that brings together art and science is the most important thing to be, not a football player or astronaut; In 5 to 10 years John Sculley and Jobs intend to make Apple a 10 or 20 billion dollar company; That scale is merely to remain competitive. The bigger concern is how that scale is achieved.; Apple hires people that want to make large contributions today not await permission to do so years from now.; People/workers rarely get to contribute to the pool of innovation which we all rely upon.; Rather than focus on Fortune 500 customers, focus on how to change how small groups/businesses work.; There should not be one computing standard. Macintosh is clearly better than IBM. Innovation emerges via competition.; IBM will eventually crush companies that are compatible with their systems; To reach tens of millions of people, a computer that is significantly different from IBM is needed. Hence Macintosh.; IBM believes in service, support, security, mainframes, and 'motherhood'.; "Apple’s key observation three years ago was that when you’re shipping 10,000,000 computers a year, even IBM does not have enough mothers to ship one with every computer. So you’ve got to build motherhood into the computer."; If Apple makes a mistake and IBM wins, the world will enter a computer Dark Ages for 20 years.; Frito-Lay, a company that dominates a market via service and support and stifles newcomers in their market.; IBM dominated and therefore did not innovate in the mainframe industry for 15 years.; The IBM platform is a repackaging of dated Apple II level technology; Apple and IBM won't have much competition in the hardware space. The days of significant hardware start-ups are gone.; New, innovative companies will focus on software. |
| 1985 | Svaneholm Castle, Sweden | Apple University Consortium Europe, Lund University with Håkan Westling | Video (YouTube); Video (iTunes); Video (Quicktime) | Computers can revolutionize education; Cooperation of European universities; Computer is a new medium among print, television, and radio; Initially, new mediums are based on old mediums; Aristotle was Alexander the Great's tutor; Petrochemical Revolution; Information Revolution; Free intellectual energy from computers; Computers will enable us to interact with Aristotles of the future; Henry Ford; "The automobile had a historical imperative"; Computers will forever change education as soon as 5 years from now; Jobs's dream is to sell Macintoshes to the Soviet Union |
| 1985 | Redwood City, CA and Pebble Beach, CA | 'Entrepreneurs' documentary | Video | NeXT Computer logo; Building a company; Leadership/communicating the vision; Product price; Delivery window; Financing/Expenses |
| 1987 | Pittsburgh, PA | Interview with Connor Freff Cochran | Video (YouTube); Video (Archive.org | Addressing the needs of higher education; Simulating historical models and making simulation building software; Taking time to observe the needs of a group of scholars in order to design and create productive tools; Delivering a paradigm shift in the curriculum of higher education for the first time since the 1960s.; Higher education introduces change to society |
| 1987 | Marin County, CA. | Interview for the BBC at Pixar's 1-year anniversary celebration. | Video | Luxo Jr. is the first truly computer-animated film to be nominated for the Academy Award for Best Animated Short.; Computer graphics algorithms are very complex and need to be implemented in the hardware to speed-up the rendering process.; Pixar developed a new algorithm that speeds-up the render process to a hundred to a thousand times faster than AVAX machines.; Computers can now render cheaper, high quality animation and this could bring back the high quality standards of Fantasia for example.; The real work in a film is the design of the piece and the storytelling. |
| 1988 | Redwood City, CA | NeXTStep demonstration of MIDI and quotation application | Video; Video (Archive.org) | Demonstrates NeXTStep operating system; Humans are tool builders and have created tools such as the bicycle, telescope, language, and mathematics to amplify their inherent abilities.; Until 1988, computers have been used to revolutionize science and industry.; In 1988, computers have finally become powerful enough to have the same impact in the arts and humanities.; Digital libraries allow for searching through vast amounts of knowledge quickly such as the complete works of William Shakespeare in under a second.; Jobs is interested in the future and uses the digital library to search for quotes about it from George Orwell and Lincoln Steffens.; Having the knowledge of civilization accessible at our fingertips will be revolutionary in the humanities.; The computer has become good enough to synthesize music of quality to accompany human virtuoso violinist.; The music is synthesized from pure mathematics and created about a tenth of a second before it is heard. He gives an example of Johann Sebastian Bach's concerto in A minor. |
| 1988 | Boston, MA | Boston Computer Society - Introduction of NeXT Computer | Audio (SoundCloud) | |
| 1989 | Urayasu, Chiba, Japan | Tokyo Bay NK Hall - Introduction of NeXT Computer | Video | |
| c. 1990s | | 'An Immigrant's Gift' documentary interview | Video | Joe Juran |
| 1990 | | Memory & Imagination: New Pathways to the Library of Congress with Stewart Brand | Video | Library of Congress; We shouldn't build too many more libraries, instead we should connect towns to the internet to provide access to the Library of Congress; Video Games as simulated learning environments; The computer is the equivalent of a bicycle for our minds |
| 1990 | | Interview with WGBH-TV | Video | Computer as bicycle for the mind; VisiCalc Spreadsheet; Desktop Publishing; 'Interpersonal computing' - Computing applied to communication and collaboration; NASA computers; Factory automation; ARPANET Computing in higher education; Computer literacy in K-12. Not enough courseware.; Completing the Macintosh; Employees as artists; Networking islands of computers; Programmer productivity; Computers in every home; Multimedia as a means not an end to communication; Douglas Englebart at SRI; Xerox PARC; Computing power applied to ease of use; Ambiguity of science and art. Mathematics as a liberal art; Thinking vs. doing; Death is the best invention of life; Homebrew Computer Club at Stanford; Blue Box; Steve Wozniak; Atlantic City computer show; West Coast Computer Faire, San Francisco; Regis McKenna; Mike Markkula; Non-incremental innovations |
| 1990 | San Francisco, CA | NeXTstation Keynote | Video | NeXTstep 2.0; NeXTstation; NeXTcube 68040; Custom applications with Interface Builder; 'Interpersonal computing'; Fax; alpha compositing; NeXTdimension; NeXTstation Color |
| 1990 | Boston, MA | Demostration of Lotus Improv at the Boston Computer Society. | Audio (SoundCloud) | Lotus Improv. |
| 1991 | Redwood City, CA | NeXT internal marketing strategy video | Video | Identifying the target customer, why they choose their products over the competition, and what distribution channels will be used to reach them; The professional workstation market is expected to grow rapidly in the next few years.; The biggest players in the workstation market are Sun Microsystems, HP Apollo, DEC, and IBM with the RS/6000; Sun Microsystems is currently the major participant in this market with an 80% market share.; NeXT's competition don't focus on user interface or have great third-party application software and are not machines for mere mortals; Market research data and industry experience suggest that the professional workstation market will grow to about 100,000 units in 1991 and triple to about 300,000 units in 1992; Customers are moving into the professional workstation category for three primary reasons: the need to write custom, mission-critical applications, the need for sophisticated networking capabilities, and the need for database-driven applications that communicate with SQL databases running on an IBM mainframe or on a Sequent machine running Oracle or Sybase.; NeXT's key competitive strengths against Sun are their superior development environment, their suite of productivity apps, and their focus on interpersonal computing.; NeXT is well positioned to compete against Sun in the professional workstation market due to their multimedia and ease of use features which provide superior interpersonal computing results.; NeXT's development environment is vastly superior to Sun's, as decided by customers’ best technical people when they return from NeXT's software camp. Developers who go through NeXT's software camp will go back raving about NeXTSTEP and telling their own management that NeXTSTEP will allow them to build their custom app three times faster than Sun.; NeXT's productivity app suite dwarfs that of Sun and includes breakthrough apps such as Lotus Improv and WYSIWYG WordPerfect. Once customers are in the professional workstation category, the productivity app comparison is no longer against PCs and Macs, it's against Sun and NeXT is winning hands down.; Interpersonal computing improves group productivity and collaboration through the use of sophisticated desktop computers and will be the largest reason people are buying NeXT computers within 24 months.; Regis McKenna once said "the best marketing is education". |
| 1991 | Portland, Oregon | Reed College Howard Vollum Award acceptance speech | Audio (Soundcloud) (with intro by Richard Crandall) | I never graduated from Reed College; Roman Meal is the cheapest way to live; Several of us would show up for meals at the Hare Krishna temple; Situational ethics; Reed College dean Jack Dudman; Generosity; Character is built not in good times but in bad times |
| 1991 | Redwood City, CA | The state of the industry on the 10th anniversary of the IBM PC | Video (Youtube) | |
| 1992 | Cambridge, MA | MIT Sloan Distinguished Speaker Series | Video (Youtube) | |
| 1993 | Redwood City, CA | Interview on Paul Rand | Video | Paul Rand; Logos; Working relationship with clients |
| 1993 | San Francisco, CA | NeXTWORLD EXPO Keynote Moscone Center | Video (YouTube) | |
| 1994 | Redwood City, CA | Steve Jobs in 1994: The Rolling Stone Interview | Text (Archive.org) | |
| 1994 | | Santa Clara Valley Historical Association Silicon Valley Documentary | Santa Clara Valley Historical Association - Steve Jobs: Visionary Entrepreneur (Archive.org); Video Clip 1; Video Clip 2; Video Clip 3; Video Clip 4 | Bill Hewlett; Failure; Changing the world; Blue Box |
| 1995 | Redwood City, CA | Steve Jobs: 'The Lost Interview'; Robert X. Cringely | Video Clip | |
| 1995 | Redwood City, CA | Smithsonian Oral History Project Interview | Transcript; Video | John F. Kennedy; Cuban Missile Crisis; Heathkits; Jobs's childhood and schooling; Public education; Unions in education; Mentors vs. Computers in education; School vouchers; Monopolies; Choice in a marketplace vs. choice in schools; Firing substandard employees; 'Amplifying your values a million to one'; On being an artist; Microsoft, a monopoly, is limiting creativity; John Sculley corrupting Apple's values; Rational profits vs. corporate greed; "The Macintosh will die..." "...how to create the next Macintosh, no one at Apple has a clue..."; Hewlett-Packard 9100A; Congressman Pete Stark and Senator John Danforth; The Kids Can't Wait Bill; Met two-thirds of the House and over half of the Senate; Congressman's vs. Senator's ability to think; Bob Dole blocked bill that would have facilitated Apple to donate 100,000 computers to schools; Bill succeeds in California, Apple donates 10,000 computers to schools; Advantages of NeXT hardware and software; Xerox PARC in 1979. GUI, Object-oriented programming, and Networking; Simula and Smalltalk; Internet and the World Wide Web; Net neutrality; California at the leading edge of a cultural shift; Pixar, Lucasfilm, George Lucas; Analog generation loss; Discusses Toy Story pre-release; "Will there ever be another software platform?" Yes; Death is the greatest invention of life; Start-up company's advantage is that large companies are sedentary; Passion required to start a company; Why Silicon Valley is a hub of innovation; Beat Generation; Rock and Roll in California Joan Baez, Grateful Dead, Janis Joplin, Jefferson Airplane, Jimi Hendrix; Stanford and Berkeley |
| 1995 | Los Angeles, CA | SIGGRAPH 1995 Keynote Speech | Video part 1; Video part 2 | Centenary of the motion picture; Scale and complexity of Toy Story; Place in History of Computer Graphics; Lumière brothers projected the first film 100 years ago in Paris; How has technology changed the way we view motion pictures?; 1895 Lumière brothers invented their own cameras and projectors; 1927 the next technological innovation was sound (almost 40 years later); Al Jolson's lines ended the era of silent pictures forever; The impact of sound: 60 million movie viewers in 1927 to 110 million viewers in 1929; The Jazz Singer was immensely popular and saved Warner Bros. studio; 1932 The next major innovation was Technicolor; 1937 first animated feature film with multiplane camera; 2D Animation was the first new form of motion picture entertainment since the first motion picture 42 years earlier; 1939 The Wizard of Oz became the first commercially successful color film; 1977 Star Wars redefined science fiction genre. Elevated special effects to become an equal partner to live action in storytelling in motion pictures; Alien, The Abyss, Terminator 2, and Jurassic Park incorporate some computer graphics special effects (but not on the scale of Toy Story); Scale and complexity of Toy Story; Toy Story is the first completely computer generated feature-length motion picture. Completely computer synthetic.; Computer graphics are not just providing a supporting role to live action but are actually providing the entire vision for the motion picture.; Pixar created a 'digital back (movie) lot'; Jobs details the workflow of creating animated movies followed by numerous statistics about Toy Story; 10 person-years went into the modeling of Toy Story; 34 terabytes of RenderMan files were rendered; 800 thousand machine hours of rendering on Sun SPARCstation 20 quad processors; Woody has 723 animation control points. 58 on the mouth alone.; Buzz Lightyear has over 600 textures; One scene has over 1 million leaves rendered on trees; Toy story is the classic 'buddy picture'. Two adversaries forced to work together by circumstance.; (The SIGGRAPH computer graphics) community has finally achieved the creation of a feature-length 3D animated synthetic film; (The SIGGRAPH computer graphics community) pioneered the next major offshoot of the motion picture (3D Animation) "It's going to be a medium in its own right." |
| 1996 | | La Télé Christophe Rasch interview with Steve Jobs | Video | Switzerland |
| 1996 | | NPR: Steve Jobs's 1996 Conversation with Terry Gross | Audio | World Wide Web, HTML; Tracking Packages; Static vs. Dynamic Web Publishing; Electronic commerce; WebObjects; Bypassing middlemen with the Web. Direct to consumer sales; Web as egalitarian medium; Shopping for information; Online software sales in the future; Broadband in the home; The Web has resources for special interest groups. e.g. online health advice; Xerox PARC in 1979. GUI, Object-oriented programming, and Networking; NeXT Computer, now strictly a software company; NASA Ames Research Center; Jobs programmed in Fortran, BASIC; Steve Wozniak; Blue Box; Apple I; Printed circuit board; The Byte Shop; Marxian profit realization crisis; One button mouse on the Mac; SRI; Graphical user interface; Pain of departing Apple; Not being afraid to fail; Apple's 10 year lead over Microsoft in 1985; Apple stopped innovating; Cost cutting is not the solution to Apple's troubles; Apple was like Jobs's first love; Apple's "major contribution was in bringing a liberal arts point of view to the use of computers."; The motivation of bringing ease of use to the Macintosh was to bring fonts/typography, graphics, photographs; Science including computer science is a liberal art; Everyone should have a mastery of computer science to some extent; The seed of Apple was "Computers for the rest of us."; "Microsoft didn't really get it." (that computers should be for everyone and easy to use); "Are we entering a time window when we might see the first successful post-PC devices?"; The future of the personal digital assistant and Internet appliances; Collegial vs. Hierarchical corporate culture; Apple is an egalitarian company. Great ideas could come from anywhere within Apple.; "[Apple] hired truly great people, and gave them the room to do great work."; "A lot of companies hired people to tell them what to do. We hired people to tell us what to do."; "[Work] is still my life but it is not all of my life."; Ed Catmull, Lucasfilm; Founding Pixar; Jobs provided the support, negotiations, and environment to make Toy Story possible; Pixar as a consumer of computing power vs. a creator of computing power |
| 1996 | San Francisco, CA | Keynote presentation at Webmania '96 Yerba Buena Center for the Arts | Video; Video (YouTube) | WebObjects |
| 1996 | San Diego, CA | WebObjects presentation at Microsoft Professional Developers Conference (MSPDC) | Video | WebObjects; Server side computing; Static vs. Dynamic Web Publishing; Airline ticketing; Electronic commerce |
| 1996 | Redwood City, CA | Steve Jobs Interview with Joel Bloom about Pixar | Video | |
| 1997 | San Francisco, CA | MacWorld Expo 1997 | Video | Developer productivity; Xerox PARC; Tim Berners-Lee; OpenStep; WebObjects; Interface Builder |
| 1997 | San Francisco, CA | WWDC Fireside Chat with Steve Jobs | Video | |
| 1997 | Boston, Massachusetts. | Macworld Expo. | Video | |
| 1997 | | CNBC interview with Steve Jobs | Video | Apple stock is trading at 1/3x sales. Competitors trade at 3-5x sales.; Jobs return to Apple; Compensation; Focussing the company's resources on core products and a few new products.; Microsoft and Apple relationship; Macintosh was the platform that brought Microsoft into the Applications business; Being CEO is not a popularity contest |
| 1997 | Cupertino, CA | Internal Meeting with Apple employees at Town Hall. | Video | |
| 1997 | San Francisco, CA | Seybold Keynote with Steve Jobs at Moscone Center | Video; Transcript | |
| 1998 | San Francisco, CA | Macworld Keynote at Moscone Center. | Video | MacOS 8.1 |
| 1998 | | 10th Anniversary of Wolfram Mathematica | Video | Congratulating Stephen Wolfram |
| 1998 | New York | Seybold Keynote with Steve Jobs at Jacob K. Javits Convention Center | Video | |
| 1998 | Cupertino, CA | Original iMac introduction in a Special Event at Flint Center. | Video | Apple has simplified its product strategy to fit four quadrants between: consumer and professional markets, and desktop and portable computers.; New PowerBook G3 model; iMac is Apple's new consumer desktop.; "Apple is back on track, and I hope that what we've shown you today shows you how we are going to springboard ahead into the future of Apple Computer." |
| 1998 | San Jose, CA | WWDC | Video; Video (Archive.org) | |
| 1998 | New York | Macworld Keynote at Jacob K. Javits Convention Center. | Video | MacOS 8.5 |
| 1998 | Cupertino, CA | Original iMac Press Interview | Video (YouTube) | The iMac is a powerful computer designed for easy internet use.; It's faster than many PCs and has a unique design inspired by the Jetsons cartoon.; It doesn't have a floppy disk drive. Research showed that only a small percentage of people still use floppy disks, and their use is fading away. Software now comes on CD-ROMs, and people are using the internet for file sharing. Removable storage devices like zip drives are available for the iMac if needed.; Apple received 150,000 pre-orders for the iMac in the first week.; There is a lot of interest from developers. Many new applications have been announced for MacOS.; The iMac uses the USB standard for connecting peripherals.; Apple is targeting several different sets of customers with the iMac, including their existing installed base, new users entering the market, and customers who have switched to other platforms.; Apple has a marketing campaign for the iMac that includes TV ads, an outdoor campaign, and a 12-page insert in consumer magazines.; Some people may not see the iMac as revolutionary, but Apple has come a long way in a year and is now ahead of the market.; iMac represents a significant step forward for Apple and for personal computing in general. Its combination of power, ease of use, and design make it an attractive option for many different types of users. |
| 1998 | Paris | Apple Expo 1998 Keynote at Paris Expo Porte de Versailles. | Audience recording. Video; Video | |
| 1998 | San Francisco | Seybold San Francisco/Publishing '98 Steve Jobs Keynote at Moscone Convention Center. | Video; Transcript | |
| 1998 | Seattle, WA | CAUSE Annual Conference General Session | Video | Literacy (computers' role in education); Net neutrality (Balkanization of the Internet); Thin clients; Affordable computing; Web portals; Television; Heroes and role models |
| 1999 | San Francisco, CA | Macworld Expo San Francisco Keynote | Video | Power Macintosh G3 (Blue and White) unveiled; PowerPC G3; SCSI; FireWire |
| 1999 | Tokyo, Japan | MacWorld Expo Tokyo Keynote | Video (YouTube); Video (Archive.org); (Audience recording mistitled as "Apple Expo 1998". Video | |
| 1999 | Tokyo, Japan | Steve Jobs Interview on Japanese Television. | Video | |
| 1999 | San Jose | Worldwide Developers Conference (WWDC) Steve Jobs Keynote at San Jose Convention Center. | Video | |
| 1999 | New York | Macworld New York Keynote with Steve Jobs at Jacob K. Javits Convention Center. | Video | |
| 1999 | Cupertino, California | Speech to employees at the Apple Campus. | Video | |
| 1999 | San Francisco, CA | Seybold Keynote | Video (YouTube); Video | Richard Crandall describes the PowerPC G4 AltiVec 'Velocity Engine' |
| 1999 | Cupertino, CA | Special Event at Flint Center. | Video | |
| 2000 | San Francisco, CA | MacWorld Expo San Francisco Keynote at Moscone Center. | Video | |
| 2000 | Tokyo, Japan | MacWorld Expo Tokyo Keynote | Video | |
| 2001 | Japan | Japanese National Public Broadcasting Organization interview | Video - uncut (archive.org); Video (Youtube) | If you are going to start something new, you have to have passion for it; People that succeed don't give up.; The personal computer is entering its third great age; The first age of the PC was productivity (ca. 1980); The second age was the internet (ca. 1994); The third age is the digital lifestyle (ca. 2001) fueled by devices like the camcorder, cameras, DVD players, cell phones.; It took a year to realize that the PC would become a major industry; Steve Wozniak did most of the engineering on the Apple I and Apple II.; At first, we made the computer kits for our friends; The circle of friends got bigger and bigger. Now its 25 million people.; Money is not a good reason to start a company; Start a company to express an idea. Sometimes that's the only way to get people to listen.; You permeate values to employees by example, ultimately.; When a product is not quite good enough, we try to stop what we are doing and make it great before we ship it.; Employees and others observe how senior management handle problems with products.; "Everybody watches very carefully when you are in a difficult situation, what decisions you make, what values you have."; We try to hire very smart people. We have a very simple organization and focus on doing very few things well.; "Focussing does not mean saying yes, it means saying no." We decide to do very few things.; People want to do something great, be excited about what they do, and be recognized for their work.; Its very motivating to envision a project in the hands of up to 25 million people; We try to allow people to do the best work of their lives.; Because others copy Apple, Apple can influence the whole industry beyond the 25 million Apple users.; Apple is in a great spot today, 3 or 4 years ago it was fragile.; Apple has focussed on the internet for the last 6–7 years.; "I love the internet but the internet has no emotion to it. Its very intellectual." It is only one thing we can do with computers.; Most people don't have the internet bandwidth to deliver emotion.; "To deliver emotion, you have to have higher bandwidth."; At Apple, we want to stand at the intersection of technology and humanities.; We want to bring the humanist side into these tools. We don't just want to serve the intellectual side.; There are a lot of forces in life that tend to funnel us down into an institutionalized path where people forget that they are very unique.; The whole computer industry wants to forget about the humanist side and just focus on the technology.; A lot of our industry just focusses on more is better. More "megahertz and megabytes" we call it "feeds and speeds".; We can do more with computers than just spreadsheets and word processors.; We want to help you express yourself in richer ways in your music, movies, photography.; Instead of storing unwatched videotapes, you want to edit them down into a little movie that you can share with others.; (You don't have to be creative to emotionally express yourself.) We have had over a million customers make movies with iMovie.; The whole personal computer industry has not previously addressed the emotional and creative side of people. It has only spoken to the side of us that is calculating numbers.; At last, with this digital lifestyle era opening, we are going to address some of these (emotional applications of computers).; I visualize things at most about 1 to 4 years down the road.; Some 5 year planning is essential, but most 5 year planning changes within a few years. |
| 2001 | Cupertino, CA | iPod (1st generation) introduction at Apple One Infinite Loop campus | Video (YouTube); Video (archive.org) | |
| 2002 | | 60 Minutes (Overtime) | Video | Analog generation loss; George Lucas; Lucas hired Edwin Catmull from New York Institute of Technology; Jobs bought computer group from Lucas in 1986 with a vision to create the world's first computer generated animated film; The Beatles as an example of a team; Business is best executed as a team effort; My greatest strength is hanging out with great and talented people; All of us need to be on guard against arrogance; There wouldn't have been a Pixar if Jobs had not been fired from Apple; Returning to Apple after being fired 12 years earlier was an example of the circle of life; Computer industry is in its infancy |
| 2005 | Palo Alto, CA | Stanford Commencement Address | Text Video | Adoption; Attending and dropping out of Reed College; Hare Krishna; Calligraphy; Serifs, Kerning, and Typography; Macintosh was the first computer with beautiful typography; "Because believing that the dots will connect down the road will give you the confidence to follow your heart even when it leads you off the well-worn path and that will make all the difference."; Hiring John Sculley; Getting fired by Apple's board of directors; NeXT Computer technology is at the heart of Apple's renaissance.; Marriage and family with Laurene Powell Jobs; "The only way to do great work is to love what you do."; Pancreatic cancer; Whole Earth Catalog; Stewart Brand; "Stay hungry. Stay foolish." Quote from the Whole Earth Catalog. |
| 2006 | New York City | CNBC interview about Apple Fifth Avenue opening | Video (YouTube); Video (Archive.org) | Apple opened its first retail store 5 years ago; SoHo Apple store was one of the most expensive to build; There was demand for a second Manhattan store; Real estate developer Harry Macklowe invited Apple to a subterranean space under a Fifth Avenue plaza; Apple proposed a 32-foot glass cube; "We've never believed in the philosophy of having flagship stores that don't make money."; "Every single one of our stores makes money."; New Fifth Avenue store is first Apple Store to be open 24 hours; 300 employees will work in the store. We are highly service oriented.; We want to invest more to create a better buying experience; We only have to convince 5% of the world to buy a Mac and we will have doubled our market share.; iPods are extremely successful in the UK. We are the number one MP3 player in France, Germany, etc. in Europe.; AMD has got some very interesting products at the high end of the server space; Intel has the best consumer chips right now. Yonah known as the Core Duo.; Intel has a strong road map for notebooks and consumer desktops.; Will we ever see an "'iPhone'"? We never talk about unannounced products. |
| 2006 | Cupertino, California | Presents new plan for new campus to Cupertino City Council | Video | |
| 2007 | San Francisco, CA | CNBC Interview on the release of the iPhone | Video | |
| 2007 | Emeryville, CA | Interview about Pixar | Video (YouTube); Video (Archive.org) | Ed Catmull; I bought into the dream of making the first computer-animated film both spiritually and financially; The combination of a new medium and John Lasseter bringing a character to life made people say, "Oh my god!"; Just trying to pay the bills and buy time was a failing strategy.; Second product syndrome: Often a second product that follows an earlier successful product, will fail because of the misunderstanding of why the initial product succeeded.; The Apple II was Apple's first product in the marketplace. It was incredibly successful. The Apple III was a dud.; "My feeling was that if we got through our second film, we'd make it."; "Our business depends on unplanned collaboration."; "We want to put everybody under one roof and we want to encourage unplanned collaboration."; "If you look closely, most overnight successes took a long time."; "The best scientists and engineers are just as creative as the best storytellers." |
| 2007 | Cupertino, CA | Internal meeting with Apple Employees at the Apple Campus. | Video (YouTube) | One of the ways people express their appreciation to the rest of humanity, is by "making something wonderful" and putting it out there. |
| 2008 | San Jose, CA | US SEC Deposition | Text; Text (Archive.org) | |
| 2010 | San Francisco, CA | Introduction of the first generation iPad at a 'Special Event' at YBCA | Video (YouTube); Video (Archive.org) | |
| 2010 | San Francisco, CA | WWDC Introduction of the iPhone 4 and FaceTime | Video (YouTube); Video (Archive.org) | |
| 2011 | Cupertino, California | Presents the plan for the new Apple Campus | Video | June 11, 2011 - Last Steve Jobs public appearance.; Apple is growing and is out of space. Need a new campus to augment existing campus.; Jobs called Bill Hewlett for help at age 12 and received a summer job building frequency counters.; New Apple campus will be on the former HP Computer Systems division; Prior to being an HP campus this land was an apricot orchard.; Hired the best architects and intend to put 12,000 people in one building; The building is "kind of like a spaceship landed.".; The building will be curved and this is expensive.; Apple already makes the biggest pieces of glass for architectural use.; The HP site is 80% parking lot and 20% landscape.; The Apple campus will be 80% landscape and 20% buildings.; Hired senior arborist from Stanford to plant trees.; Parking will be subterranean.; Building is four stories high. "We want the whole place to be human scale."; The campus will be self powered and backed up by the grid; The use of space is dramatically improved over the HP campus.; 20% more work space than on the HP campus.; 350% more landscape than on the HP campus.; 60% more trees than the HP campus; 90% less pavement than the HP campus; The cafe will feed 3000 people in a sitting.; Apple is the largest tax payer in Cupertino; Apple moving away would not be good for Cupertino; Apple employs very talented people which improves Cupertino; Apple has biodiesel buses that (in 2011) were the cleanest buses.; Architecture students will come to Cupertino to see this building.; Employment will increase by about 20%.; Both of my (adopted) parents died of Lung cancer from smoking; Break ground in 2012; "We want to move in in 2015.". |
| 2011 | | 60 Minutes (Posthumous) | Video | Definitely taking LSD was one of the most important things in my life |

== See also ==
How to Grow an Apple: Did Steve Jobs Speak Apple to Success? Aalborg University, Lotte Skjøttgaard Sørensen, 2013
