= IPod advertising =

Apple used a variety of advertising campaigns to promote its iPod portable digital media player. The campaigns include television commercials, print ads, posters in public places, and wrap advertising campaigns. These advertising techniques are unified by a distinctive, consistent style that differs from Apple's other ads.

== Original advertisement ==
The first advertisement for the first iPod (only compatible with computers) in 2001 featured a man in his room grooving to his digital music collection on his Apple iBook. He drags his music to his iPod, closes his iBook, and plugs in the ear phones. He hits play and the music increases its volume. He then dances and hops around the room, then puts on his jacket, sliding the iPod into the pocket. He dances to the door and leaves the room. The song used was "Take California" by the Propellerheads, which became the hallmark of all subsequent advertisements.

One of the problems, noted Apple ad agency creative director Ken Segall, was the use of what he termed a "real person". Steve Jobs, he stated, avoided using people in his ads because it was difficult to find an actor who appealed to everyone. Another problem was that, "It was somewhat uncomfortable to watch, and on the web some started to refer to it as the 'iClod' commercial ... it was a young guy trying to act cool, and doing so in a fairly pitiful way".

== Silhouette style ==
Example of an iPod silhouette advertisement under the use of "Technologic" (2005) by Daft Punk

Susan Alinsangan, a Chiat/Day art director, came up with the design of the iPod silhouette commercials in 2003, along with the help of Chiat/Day's director Lee Clow, and James Vincent, a former DJ and musician. She worked on the print campaign with artist Casey Leveque of Santa Monica's Rocket Studio

The silhouette advertising campaign featured dark silhouetted characters against brightly colored backgrounds. They were usually dancing and, in television commercials, backed by up-beat, energetic music. The silhouetted dancers held iPods while listening to them with Apple's supplied earphones. The iPods and earphones appeared in white to stand out against the colored background and black silhouettes. Apple changed the style of these commercials often depending on the song's theme or genre. "It had a hook that was really was captivating and didn't try to impress us with the coolness of any particular person. Instead, it did what Apple does best: it created an iconic image, which immediately came to communicate Apple and iPod."

At first, however, Steve Jobs did not like the Silhouette campaign when it was presented to him. He was not certain that the silhouettes would work since they didn't show the product in detail and they didn't explain what the iPods did. The ad designers fought to convince Steve and copywriter James Vincent suggested adding the tagline "1,000 songs in your pocket" to address the issue. Steve Jobs decided to go with it. He would later claim it was his idea to push for the more iconic ads.

This change of strategy was a very successful one for the company. Previous ads for Apple's computers usually featured a high-quality photograph of the product on a white background with a short tag-line. In those ads the focus was entirely on the product and its craftsmanship. With the creation of the Silhouette campaign, however, the focus shifted from convincing consumers to purchase the device to asking them to "buy the emotion." Everything about the ads was energetic — the bright shades of tropical-like colors of lime green, yellow, fuchsia, bright blue, and pink, to the energetic and danceable rock, pop, and hip hop music, and the simple tag-lines. The whiteness of the iPod and the earphones against the black of the silhouette and the bright backgrounds further helped launch the iPod into icon status. The white earbuds also became an icon signifying the iPod itself. The ubiquitous nature of the advertising campaign ensured everyone was exposed to ads.

=== Evolution ===
The original television commercials and posters featured solid black silhouettes against a solid bright color, which usually changed every time the camera angle changed. Some of the television adverts also depict highlights on the silhouettes using darkened shades of the background color, and shadows on the floor. Since then, various commercials in the campaign have changed the format further:

- By the time of the advent of the iTunes Store in 2003 the ads became as much a vehicle to promote the music and the music store as the device itself. Variants of adverts with differing soundtracks were run for every iPod to enable many current artists of various successful genres to appeal to as wide a base of potential users.
- The next live-action TV commercial (iPod 3G "Wild Postings") that returned to the format of the original 1G advert made reference to the silhouette theme to emphasize its icon status. It involved a man walking past a set of silhouette posters, which came to life and danced when his iPod was playing, but froze when he paused it. The song used was "Ride" by The Vines.
- Artists songs to appear in iPod /iTunes adverts include: Nelly Furtado, U2, The Resource, Cut Chemist, Feist, Caesars, The Prototypes, Quantic, Feature Cast, Gorillaz, Jet, N.E.R.D., Steriogram, Daft Punk, The Black Eyed Peas, Ozomatli, Wolfmother, The Fratellis, Nicodemus & Quantic, The Ting Tings, Coldplay. Many Record Labels despite their past issues with the iTunes Store are keen to get their artists featured to benefit from the promotion of new material. The commercials all but guaranteed an increase in record sales - the inclusion of Feist's song, "1234" helped the single skyrocket up the Billboard charts, reaching No. 8 on the Billboard Top 100.
- In 2004, Wired magazine featured a new service where people could create their own iPod ads from their personal photos.
- The TV commercial (featuring Caesars song "Jerk It Out") for the first version of the iPod shuffle used a green background with black arrows moving in the background representing the "shuffle" icon. The silhouettes danced on top of the arrows as if they were a moving floor while listening to iPod shuffles hanging from white lanyards.
- Following the release of the fifth-generation iPod, three TV commercials, one featuring Eminem, (Sparks) one featured Wynton Marsalis and Wolfmother, the first two made radical changes to the style, by exchanging the solid changing backgrounds for abstract composite backgrounds based around a main color (orange and blue respectively). The camera shots alternate between the artists performing their songs (Eminem sporting a white microphone, Marsalis' drummer sporting white drumsticks) and traditional silhouette dancers listening to iPods. The solid silhouette was also traded for a more varied silhouette, which shows certain facial features of a person. The third advert (Lovetrain) featured the dancers again acting out the song by Wolfmother. Apple CEO Steve Jobs suggested that this more complex composition would be the style of future commercials as well; certainly the Lovetrain-style ad was continued with (Party) featuring the Fratellis and (Island). The Eminem advert was temporarily withdrawn when Eminem entered into a rights dispute. In addition shoe maker Lugz claimed the advert plagiarised an advert they had released a few years earlier which was not without reason.
- In early 2006 a new type of iPod commercial (Cubicle) was released. It was thirty seconds, and it spotlighted album art. The album art was constructed into a city, and then dismantled and it flowed into an iPod nano and said "1,000 songs in your pocket", the slogan for the first-generation iPod Nano.
- In August 2006, another reimagining of the iPod commercial was introduced through an ad for Bob Dylan's album available in the music store, Modern Times. In this new style, the only silhouette facet of it was that it seemed lighting was reduced on the figure of Bob Dylan and the female dancer, while the iPod was brightened. Color variation, as well as reflection on the face of the guitar, is evident. The ad is much more realistic and the people, as well as details, are much more visible. This ad was an almost complete departure from the traditional, and even the Eminem-styled adverts of the past.
- In September 2006, Apple once again reimagined their vision of the silhouette ad campaign to go with the new iPod nano aluminum case. They made a departure from the contrasting background and characters. Both the characters and the background are thrown into deeper shadow than we've ever seen before, and, in order to showcase the new colors of the nano, the characters swing their nanos around while dancing, which leaves a luminescent light trail.
- In November 2006 Apple used their original style again in their Latino TV Ad to mark the launch of iTunes Latino at the store.
- Also in November 2006, Apple released a new ad (Put some music on) for the second generation iPod shuffle, which featured people clipping the minuscule player to different articles of clothing while jamming to the beat of Prototypes' "Who's Gonna Sing?".
- At Macworld 2007, Apple debuted their new ad campaign, featuring a reverse color scheme of previous campaigns: Colored silhouettes on a black background, as well as a second styled ad featuring colored silhouettes amongst a dynamic, moving and multi-colored background.
- Paul McCartney walking and strumming a mandolin performing his song "Dance Tonight" being very much like an updated version of the Eminem commercial, having backdrops of buildings and featuring McCartney walking with animations of shapes around him.
- In November 2007, Apple released a new ad (Queen) using a similar formula to the one used with the "Mi Es Tropical" ad (by Nicodemus and Quantic), but with a light emanating from the background as if the characters were on a stage. This time the ad is featuring Mary J. Blige along with a group of dancer in silhouette form. The song is "Work That" from the album Growing Pains.
- YouTube member njhaley (More commonly known as Nick Haley) created a fan commercial of the iPod touch. Apple was impressed with the commercial and then contacted him about putting the commercial on the air. He and Apple's advertising agency TBWA then got to work on making a more polished version of the Ad which ran during the 2007 World Series on Fox.
- iPod Touch adverts increasingly move to promote the computing, gaming and internet purposes of the product with background music often being the only reminder it is a music player too. At the same time iPod adverts have started to decline as the priority for production and sales shifts to the computing platform devices such as the iPod Touch and iPhone.
- In April 2008, a new ad (Gamma) was released following the original formula with representation of both earphones and iPod Classics – but with animated backgrounds and more detailed silhouettes. The song was "Shut Up and Let Me Go" by The Ting Tings
- On May 20, 2008, a new ad (Sonic) premiered during the American Idol finale. It follows the original form but with even more animated backgrounds and Coldplay is shown in the shadow. The song was "Viva la Vida" by Coldplay. It does not feature a material presence to an iPod or earphones but reminds viewers the Coldplay song is available on iTunes.

== See also ==
- Apple Inc. advertising
