= Tissue meeting =

A tissue meeting is an informal presentation of creative work or other ideas to a client. Tissue meetings are common in advertising and design agencies and allow these agencies to test their thinking on their clients without committing to progressing with any of the work. The client is allowed input in the knowledge that the ideas being presented may be in the early stages of development.

== History ==
The tissue meeting was the brainchild of Jay Chiat, founder of the Chiat Day advertising agency in New York City. Chiat Day was the agency responsible for the advertisement "1984" for Apple Computer that introduced the Macintosh computer. The tissue meeting concept was taken across the Atlantic in the early nineties by London agency HHCL

== Etymology ==
The term 'tissue meeting' has its origins in the pre-computer days when advertising layouts were drawn on tracing (tissue) paper prior to being worked up. The concept of presenting unfinished work to clients led to the sessions being called tissue meetings.
