= Mashup (video) =

Combining multiple unrelated videos into one video

A video mashup (also written as video mash-up) is a video that combines multiple pre-existing, unrelated video sources into one larger video. It is part of a global mashup culture.

In the United States, video mashups are derivative works as defined by the United States Copyright Act 17 U.S.C. § 101, and as such, they may find protection from copyright claims under the doctrine of fair use. Examples of mashup videos include movie trailer remixes, vids, YouTube poops, and supercuts.

== Music videos ==
There are several different types of music video mashups.

- The first type is a derivative music video, which is created by combining two or more pre–existing videos. These videos are typically both music videos, but they may also include other songs, videos, and still images.
- The second type consists of a user recording their own track or vocals, and then combining the recording with other tracks from the Internet.
- The third type is a music video created from clips of performances of the song. This type is likely the most widespread of the three types.

Music video mashups are typically edited to match the rhythm of the original song.

== Political videos ==
Political video mashups are a primary example of citizen-generated content. These mashups allow the creator to form new meanings by juxtaposing two pieces of original source material; for example, someone may take footage of a politician's speech and 'mash it up' with footage from a popular reality television show. This form of mashup, according to Richard L. Edwards and Chuck Tryon, can be accepted as allegories of citizen empowerment. According to their article 'Political Video Mashups as Allegories of Citizen Empowerment', the videos are empowering because the users become more literate with online and offline information they receive daily; they become more active when it comes to interpreting meaning and also realising how a speech may have been manipulated.

Online videos such as political mashups are starting to take on a serious role within the politics of the United States of America. In the 2008 elections (often referred to as the 'YouTube elections') more than 40% of voters watched video content relating to the elections online. Now that the internet is so widely accessible it enables the user to make and find digestible content; political mashup videos can make a serious speech more humorous, accessible and understandable. However, because anybody can create these mashups, it is important to remember that the original meaning could have been violated. Edwards and Tryon mention that parody has become the most important form of critical intertextuality. Often, the creator of a political mashup will completely flip the meaning in order to make it funny, some mashup artists choose to make an entirely manufactured meaning from source material. Notable examples of political mashup videos and artists can be found below.

== Trailers ==
Trailer mashups, also known as re-cut trailers, involve collecting multiple pieces of film footage from one or multiple movies and editing them to create a new trailer. Trailer mashups are often created for a movie that does not exist or to change the genre of an existing film. Trailer mashups existence and popularity can be credited to convergence culture and the Web 2.0 infrastructure, allowing films to be easily accessed and shared online on video sharing websites such as YouTube.

Film has long been a read-only medium, it was only meant to be watched. With the expansion of YouTube and other video sharing websites over the years it has allowed film to be transformed into a read-write form of media. Digital files can now be accessed, edited and uploaded onto the internet. Free editing software is widely accessible so anyone with access to digital movie files can create a trailer mashup.

The trailer mashups are not only a user generated form of digital creativity but a way to create anticipation for future releases, working in tandem with current movie trailers. Movie trailers are designed to give minimal plot detail and to create hype and anticipation. Fan made trailer mashups allow the audience to perform their own cinematic spin on current movie footage. This allows the trailer to focus on a specific actor or portion of the film. It could even change the plot or genre of the film entirely. The user generated trailer mashup allows for the creator disregard advertising and promotion paths.

== Supercuts ==
The term supercut was first created by Andy Baio. Also known as supercut video mashups, they focus on the phrases and devices that are repeated in movies and TV and repeat them in a comic effect. The video content adds context to these clichés, and presents them in a new light, or inspire a moratorium on them.

The supercut first appeared a year after YouTube was created. In 2006, an audience that would turn out to grow to more than six million watched CSI: Miami's David Caruso don a pair of sunglasses after making a glib remark about a victim. In the video Caruso keeps doing that same action for seven minutes. The clip was perhaps the most prominent supercut before the term was even invented, and that was not by accident. It was because of the way the creator edited away to the screaming finale of the opening credits in between each iteration, establishing a jokey rhythm and a perennial callback. Details like these are key in the supercut genre.

== Web application videos ==
According to Eduardo Navas, web application mashups is a type of Regenerative Remix that developed with an interest to extend the functionality of software for specific purposes. Usually combinations of pre-existing sources brought together. The emergence of the web application mashups is for practical purposes. However, Navas recognizes that the reflexive mashups also can be used for entertainment and the most typical example is Vine.

Vine is the most used video app in the market, which for creating 6-second looping videos, prioritizes the visual. To better understand the creative capabilities of Vine's limitations, we analyze its formal elements. The interface centers on a timeline: the video recording begins as the user touches the screen of their mobile device, and the recording takes place only so long as they're touching the screen. Given this touch-and-hold interface, there's no post-production editing: edits can be made by letting go of the touch before the end of the six seconds, framing a new shot, and then touching again to capture the next image in the montage.

== Relationship to montages ==
- For Sergei Eisenstein, 'montage is an idea that arises from the collision of independent shots-shots even opposite to one another to form the "dramatic" principle and means of unrolling an idea with the help of single shots: the "epic" principle'.
- Eisenstein managed to compress time and space of videos through his skills at editing and it influences the basic principles of video mashup.
- Montage creates conflict of art by:
  - Being: It is an everlasting form of friction between two contradictory opposites.
  - Synthesis: It comes to be from the opposition between thesis and antithesis (is used in writing or speech when two opposites are introduced for contrasting effect).
- Conflict in art is divided by:
1. Social Mission: To make ‘real’ the contradictions of Being and help form intellectual concepts.
2. Nature: Natural existence Vs creative tendency. Application the principals of rational logic to art.
3. Methodology: The collision of organic form Vs. the logical of rational form creates the dialect of the art- form.
- Visual counterpoints in the moving image (cinema)
1. Spatial counterpoint of graphic art
2. Temporal counterpoint of music

A precedent for video mashups can be discovered in the montage films of Eisenstein.

== Notable examples ==
Hillary 1984 - In March 2007 Hillary 1984, a mashup of Apple's 1984 launch commercial for the Macintosh with footage of Hillary Clinton used in the place of Big Brother, went viral in the early stages of the race for the 2008 Democratic presidential nomination. The video was produced in support of Barack Obama by Phil de Vellis, an employee of Blue State Digital, but was made without the knowledge of either Obama's campaign, or his employer: de Vellis stated that he made the video in one afternoon at home using a Mac and some software. Political commentators including Carla Marinucci and Arianna Huffington, as well as de Vellis himself, suggested that the video demonstrated the way technology had created new opportunities for individuals to make an impact on politics.

Cassetteboy - Their videos mainly focus on comedy, but many have a political message within them. For example, Cameron’s Conference Rap (which uses clips of David Cameron set to the beat of Eminem’s Lose Yourself), Cassetteboy vs Nick Griffin vs Question Time and Cassetteboy vs The News. However, not all have such a strong political emphasis. In an interview, Mike (one of the two people behind the channel) talks about how mash-up is an accessible practice, saying “It’s not an easy thing to do, but you don’t need very much to do it. You don’t need a camera or a microphone. You just need some footage and these days we’re drowning in digital content.”

YouTube Rewind - YouTube Rewind was a yearly video series produced and released by YouTube from 2010 to 2019. It was a mash-up of various videos that had gone viral on the website in the previous year. The series started by simply placing clips of the videos next to one another in a countdown style, but then changed to a mash-up of both video and music, using YouTube stars to reference the videos. It did not have a political or informative stance, but rather, one that was celebratory of the website and the people who were active on it.

== Copyright issues ==
Mashup videos are increasingly popular online. When the mashup creators remix two or more videos or music from various sources e.g. TV, film, music etc., they may not be aware of the copyright of the original source. Without the permission of copyright owner, mashup video artists may violate the copyright law and charged by criminal copyright infringement. If they violate the law, their videos will be forced to take down on YouTube. YouTube can ban their accounts and they are forbidden to post anything online. In a more serious case, the copyright owners reserve their rights to sue the mashup artists and they may have a maximum punishment of five years in jail and large fines. It is an obstacle that hinders mashup artists to develop mashup video more. The original copyright law is written in 1980s or even earlier and it did not include the possibilities of copyright infringement exist in digital era. Therefore, mashup artists and public suggests a reform of copyright law regarding on remix culture and mashup videos in order to give more freedom for mashup artists to create their work.

=== United States ===
In the United States, the Copyright Act of 1976 acts as the basis of copyright law to protect the rights of the original creators. It protects the original works of authorship. To some extent, it allows artists to reproduce the work and create derivative works of the original work.

Fair use is a limitation and exception to the copyright law. According to the Hofstra Law Review, “If mashup artists could prove that they use others’ songs or clips to criticize, comment, or teach, then mashup artists might be able to use the copyrighted material without authorization."

Courts in the United States balance four factors when considering fair use:

1. Purpose and character of the use (including: commercial nature, non-profit education purposes)
2. Nature of the copyrighted work
3. Amount and substantiality of the portion used in relation to the copyrighted work as a whole
4. Effect of the use upon the potential market or value of the copyrighted work

In 2012, video mashup artist Jonathan McIntosh spoke before the United States Copyright Office to advocate for exemptions to the Digital Millennium Copyright Act. The final rulemaking stated an exemption for: "Motion pictures (including television shows and videos), as defined in 17 U.S.C. 101, where circumvention is undertaken solely in order to make use of short portions of the motion pictures for the purpose of criticism or comment in limited instances."

=== United Kingdom ===
Starting from Wednesday 1 October 2014, the new EU law becomes effective in the United Kingdom. There is an amendment to the Copyright, Design and Patents Act 1988. It is now legal for people to use “limited amount” of copyrighted material in online video for the purposes of “parody, caricature or pastiche” without the consent of the copyright holder, only if their work do not convey a discriminatory message, or compete with the original. A judge will decide whether the video is funny enough to classify as a parody and if it violates the law.

Although the mashup video is now legal in practice, it does not affect YouTube's terms of service.

== See also ==
- Video editing
- Remix culture
- VJing
- YouTube poop
