= Marinucci =

Marinucci is a surname. Notable people with the surname include:

- Angela Marinucci, one of the six criminals jailed for the murder of Jennifer Daugherty
- Carla Marinucci, American political reporter
- Chris Marinucci (born 1971), American ice hockey player
