= Steve Hayden =

American advertising executive (1947–2025)

- Born: May 21, 1947; St. Charles, Missouri, U.S.
- Died: August 27, 2025 (aged 78); Patchogue, New York, U.S.
- Occupation: Advertising executive

Stephen Edward Hayden (May 21, 1947 – August 27, 2025) was an American advertising executive. He was the Vice Chairman and Chief Creative Officer of Ogilvy Worldwide. Hayden is one of the most important figures of the late twentieth century advertising, leading creative teams at both Chiat/Day and BBDO on the Apple Inc.'s Computer account.

== Early life ==
Stephen Edward Hayden was born on May 21, 1947, in St. Charles, Missouri. His father was an internist and his mother was an opera singer. He was the youngest of four sons. In 1949, when Hayden was two years old, his family relocated to San Jose, California, where his father was the first internist in the area and eventually ran the O'Connor Hospital there. At 14, Hayden was sent to boarding school at the Interlochen Center for the Arts where he studied cello (and where he served as chairman of the board of trustees). After graduating from high school at Interlochen, he moved to Los Angeles to go to school at University of Southern California. He graduated in 1968 with a degree in English.

== Career ==
Hayden began his career in Detroit as a copywriter on the General Motors corporate account. When he returned to California, he divided his attention between advertising and television scriptwriting (for Welcome Back, Kotter), eventually focusing on advertising. After working at a number of agencies, he was recruited to Chiat-Day where he and Lee Clow were co-creators of the notable 1984 Orwellian take-off campaign for Apple Inc.

in 1985, John Sculley led an internal coup that ousted Steve Jobs as President of Apple.Sculley ordered a review of Apple’s advertising agencies that resulted in the firing of Chiat/Day and the creative team of Hayden and Clow.

In 1986, after Sculley awarded the Apple account to BBDO, Hayden moved to BBDO to become the Chairman and CEO of West Coast operations. Apple had fired Chiat/Day because, as Sculley said, “We were concerned whether Chiat could handle our strategic complexity.” Hayden said that the management team led by John Sculley "loved the advertising but hated the agency" and Sculley encouraged BBDO head Phil Dusenberry to hire Hayden away – which he did. BBDO held onto the estuous Apple account for more than a decade, winning the Grand Effie award for the launch of the Apple Powerbook.

In 1994, Hayden moved to Ogilvy to head the IBM account – which had moved to Ogilvy in the single largest account consolidation in advertising history. He led the team that created and launched IBM's award-winning e-business campaign. Hayden contributed to work for American Express, Kodak, Motorola, Dove, Cisco and SAP. He and his team at Ogilvy created the "Hello Moto" campaign for Motorola.

== Death ==
Hayden died at a hospital in Patchogue, New York, on August 27, 2025, at the age of 78.
