= Mashup (culture) =

Rearranging spliced parts of musical pieces

Participants in an online music scene who rearrange spliced parts of musical pieces form mashup culture. The audio-files are normally in MP3 format and spliced with audio-editing software online. The new, edited song is called mashup. The expression mashup culture is also strongly connected to mashup in music. Even though it was not originally a political community, the production of mash-up music is related to the issue of copyright. Mashup Culture is even regarded as "a response to larger technological, institutional, and social contexts".

== History ==
The history of mashup culture in general can be dated back to the beginnings of dada and conceptual art. Artists such as Marcel Duchamp were the first to introduce already existing objects, which they rearranged and combined in collages, to the world of higher art. These artists believed that even though certain artifacts were ascribed a certain meaning, this meaning could be altered through rearranging them and putting them into a new context. However, it was still quite a long way to the beginning of mashup culture in music. From the early 2000s on, music was more and more distributed through the internet. With the introduction of MP3 audio files, it became much easier to access and download music. Not only could music be accessed easier, it could also be transformed and mixed in ways that were not possible before. Especially for younger people, this new gained freedom when it came to the accessibility of audio files lead to the development of a new form of cult around the transformation of musical pieces. This "reworking MP3 recordings pulled from the Internet" was turning into more than just a fashion just as "the Internet is more than just a means of distribution, it becomes a raison d’eˆtre for a culture based on audio data’’ states Alistair Riddell in 2001. During that time, the first versions of mashup music were published, sometimes not under the term mashup but under the name of "creative bootleg" or "bastard pop". Even though the creation of a new song by combining at least two samples of different songs was also used in other music styles such as hip hop before, it was only with the rise of the MP3 audio file along with easy-to-use computer mash-up programs that mash-up was transformed into an own culture as such. Especially peer-to-peer sharing was contributing to this phenomenon: People who create mashup music can easily distribute it and share it with other people through online programs.

== Forms of mashup culture ==
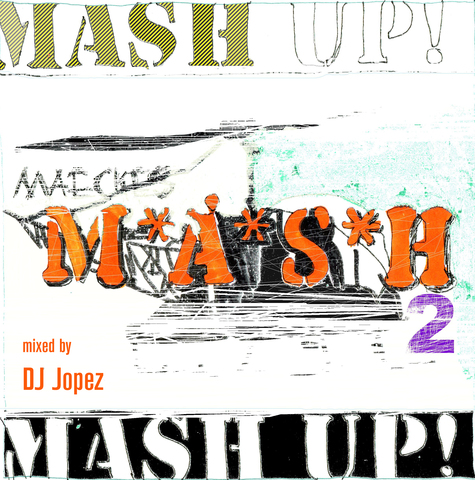
Cover of the Mixtape Mash Up 2 by DJ Jopez

Mashup culture is motivated by a number of different factors.

=== Statement of art ===
Mashup culture is sometimes regarded as a cultural movement against common, existing music that is published by the music industry. In 2002, a Newsweek article described the mashup of songs as a strategy of Londoner DJs to transform music they considered bad into something they could appreciate and were willing to listen to. Even though mashup culture has its origin in online communities, it entered a more art-related realm. It is art used as a statement against the content music industry provides.

=== Political statement ===
It can even be considered as a political statement against copyright laws and restrictions imposed by the government as well. "Reframing of the original narrative" is regarded as a way to create a new and unique product which leads to a "fresh perspective" of the original. Murray states "there’s the question of the kind of Internet we want moving forward – one increasingly controlled by corporate gatekeepers who get to sanction what creative expression looks like, or one in which the freedom of this expression is valued above share price". Copyright issues have always been limiting the possibilities of mashup culture. Those implications by law have led to the problem of online piracy. Mashups are often created with illegally acquired content. This closeness to illegality has become part of this culture. "In some cases, the illegality of piracy contributes to the appeal of unauthorized copies online" states Shiga in her article Copy-and-Persist: The Logic of Mash-Up Culture. Even though copyright laws were intentionally supposed to stop illegal downloads, they contributed to the appeal of mashup and to the culture existing around it.

=== Do-it-yourself culture ===
Another important aspect of the success of mashup culture nowadays lies in the do-it-yourself or DIY trend. Consumers are turning into producers as well, especially due to the simplification of online tools that help creating personalized content.

The audience is taking on a DIY spirit, each masher becoming a mini-Burroughs, cutting the music and pasting it on a blank sheet of MP3

— Serazio

== Mashup in current literature ==
=== DJ Spooky ===
Paul D. Miller, also known as DJ Spooky, Sound Unbound: Sampling Digital Music and Culture, a book about mashup culture's influence on society. It focuses on "the nature of that transformation", stating that it has been "fuelled by rapid advances in technology that have transformed art and communication". He describes sampling as an essential part of our society. The book was published by the MIT Press and has been regarded highly by scholars such as Lawrence Lessig.

== See also ==
- Mashup (music)
- Mashup (video)
- Mashup (book)
- Mashup (web application hybrid)

== Literature ==
- Weidenbaum, Marc (2008). "Mix and mash-up — An experimental musician explores how technology has transformed our cut-and-paste culture". Nature. 453 (33–34). Nature Publishing Group: 33–34. doi:10.1038/453033a.
