= Binoculars Building =

Office building in Los Angeles, California

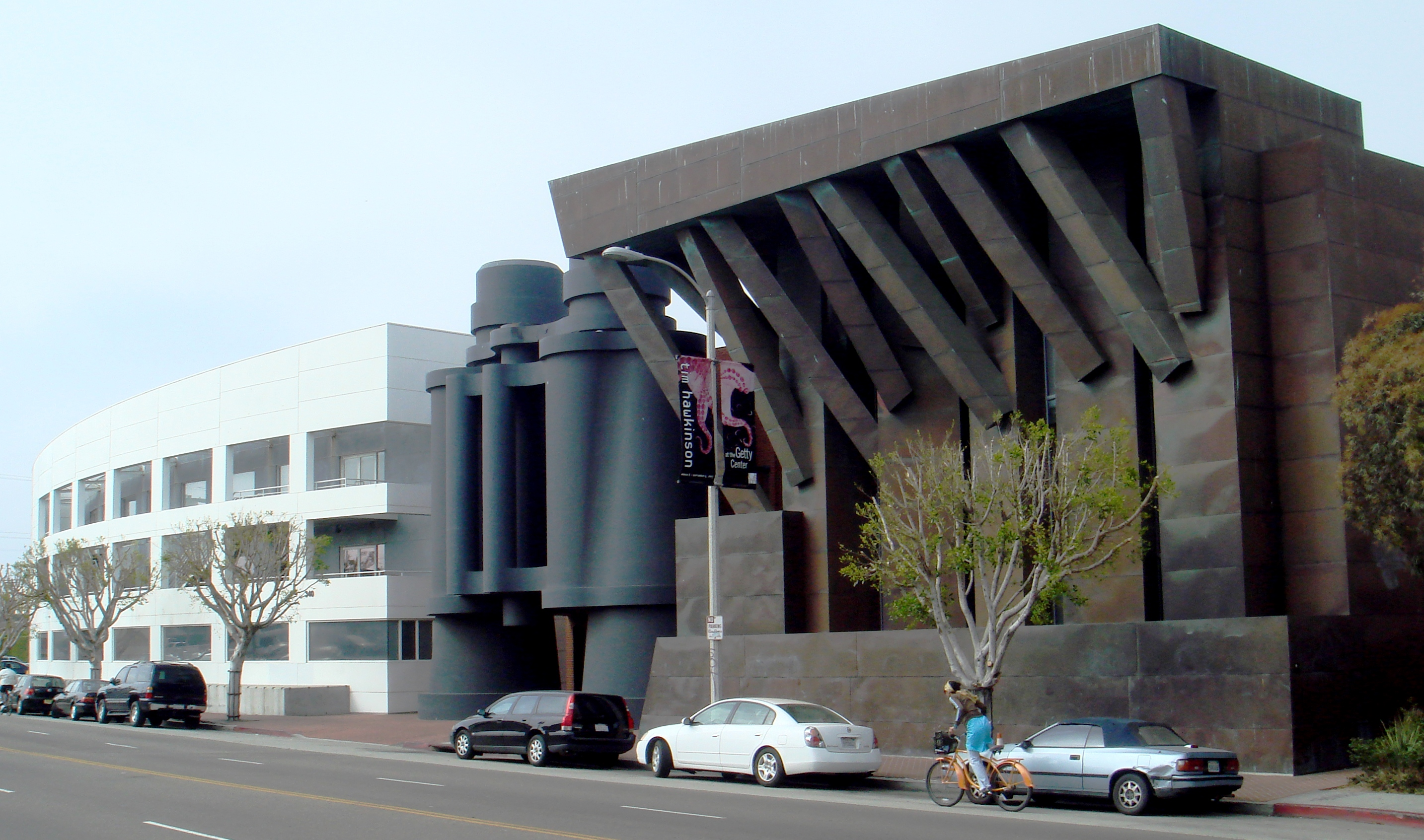
- The Binoculars Building seen in May 2007
- Interactive map of the Binoculars Building area
- Alternative names: Chiat/Day Building

General information
- Type: Commercial office
- Architectural style: Postmodern
- Location: 340 Main Street, Venice, Los Angeles, California, United States
- Coordinates: 33.99539°N 118.47692°W
- Current tenants: Google
- Completed: 1991
- Owner: W. P. Carey & Co.

Design and construction
- Architect: Frank Gehry

The Binoculars Building is Google's campus in the Venice neighborhood of Los Angeles, California. Originally known as the Chiat/Day Building, it was built in 1991 for the advertising agency Chiat/Day (now TBWA\Chiat\Day) and designed by architect Frank Gehry. The building has a prominent public artwork entitled Giant Binoculars (1991), designed by artists Claes Oldenburg and Coosje van Bruggen, on its street-facing façade, hence the vernacular name.

The Giant Binoculars sculpture covers both a car and pedestrian entrance; the entrance to the parking garage is between the two telescopes of the binoculars. The 75,000-square-foot (7,000 m^{2}) building was delayed for a few years after hazardous materials were found on the building site, requiring removal. The latest tenant of this building was Google in 2011, which added two neighboring buildings as part of a major expansion to establish a larger employment presence in Los Angeles.

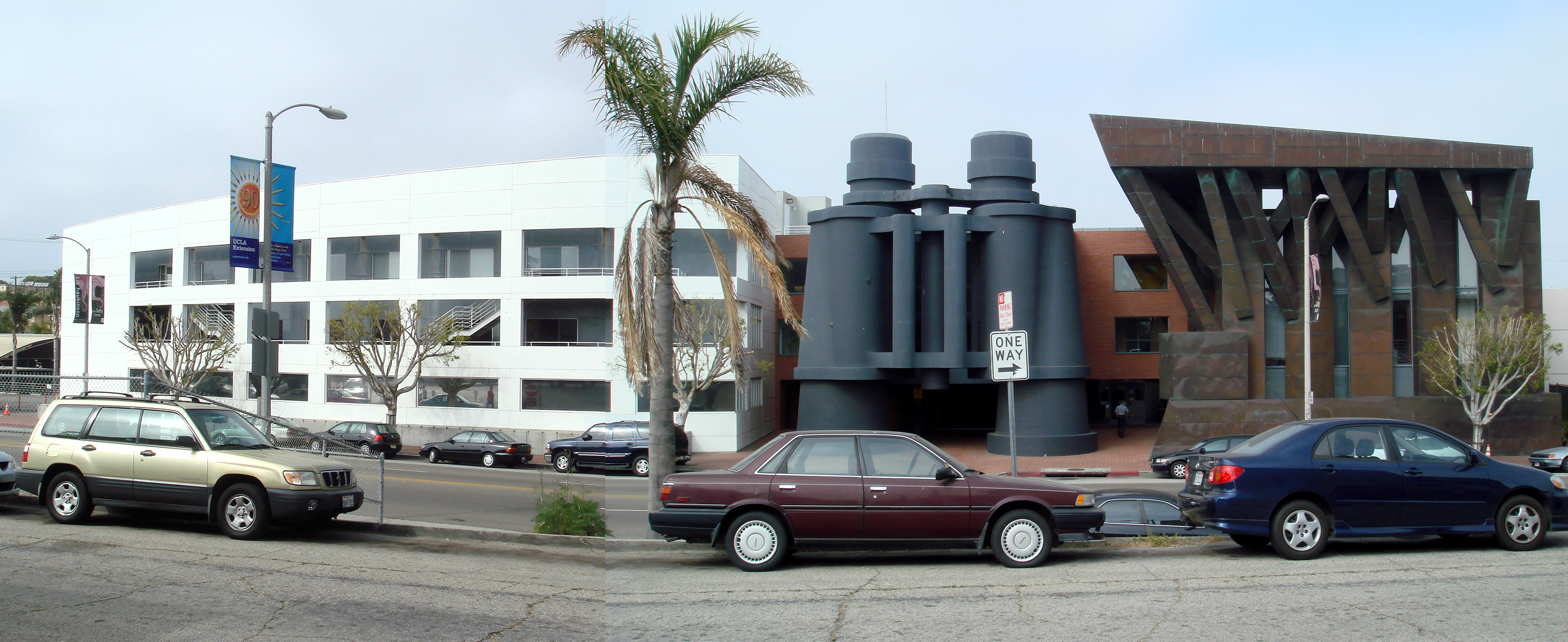
Panorama showing proportion of the building in May 2007.

== See also ==
- List of works by Frank Gehry
