= Hillary 1984 =

Hillary 1984 is the title of the viral video that combines the footage of the 2008 presidential campaign web announcement by Hillary Clinton with the 1984 Super Bowl commercial by Apple Inc. for the launch of Macintosh. The video shows the same blond female athlete from the 1984 Super Bowl commercial updated with an iPod. The Big Brother image that she throws the sledgehammer at is replaced with Hillary Clinton announcing that she is running for president. It ends with the original text replaced with, "On Jan. 14, the Democratic primary will begin. And you'll see why 2008 won't be like 1984." The Apple symbol is a morphed into an "O", which is followed by a logo for Barack Obama's presidential campaign website. Barack Obama's presidential spokesman Bill Burton has said "Hillary 1984" was not created by the Obama campaign.

Phillip de Vellis later admitted to creating the video and resigned from his position at Blue State Digital, who had also been unaware that he had made it. De Vellis stated that he made the video in one afternoon at home using a Mac and some software. Political commentators including Carla Marinucci and Arianna Huffington, as well as de Vellis himself, suggested that the video demonstrated the way technology had created new opportunities for individuals to make an impact on politics.
