= Roland De Wolk =

American journalist

Roland De Wolk (born 1953) is an American author and print and television journalist from the San Francisco Bay Area. His career has spanned four decades. He has won multiple awards for his journalism, including a lifetime achievement award. He has been described as "a star journalist" and "an ace reporter."

== Career ==
=== Print journalism ===
De Wolk spent the first half of his four-decade career at publications such as the Oakland Tribune and San Francisco Chronicle. He also wrote for publications such as the New York Times and Chicago Tribune as well as the Paris Metro (now defunct). In 1995 he co-wrote a travel guidebook for the San Francisco area called Our Town. After the near shutdown of the Oakland Tribune in 1991 and observing changes in the media landscape in the early years of the Internet, De Wolk moved into television and online journalism.

=== TV and online journalism ===
De Wolk moved to television journalism and worked at KTVU from 1991 to 2013. He took legal action against the station after being fired alongside two other producers when a list of fake and racially offensive names, supposedly of pilots on board a crashed Asiana flight, was read on the air. While at KTVU, he won multiple awards for his investigative journalism.

He was a contributing reporter/producer for the Chauncey Bailey Project, which covered the murder case of the well known Bay Area journalist and editor-in-chief of the Oakland Post.

=== Academia ===
Since 1993 he has been a lecturer and adjunct professor of journalism at San Francisco State University’s Journalism Department, where he taught online journalism as well as news writing, reporting, feature reporting and investigative reporting. Working with Professor Emeritus Leonard Sellers, De Wolk assisted in founding SFSU's Online Journalism Program, which started NewsPort.org.

=== Publications ===
In 1997 he co-wrote (with photographer John Swain) a guidebook to family campgrounds in Northern California.

In 2000 he wrote one of the earliest college textbooks on online journalism, Introduction to Online Journalism: Publishing News and Information (2000).

In 2021 he wrote a biography of Leland Stanford, the American industrialist and politician who founded Stanford University, titled American Disruptor: The Scandalous Life of Leland Stanford.

== Awards and recognition ==
De Wolk won a Society of Professional Journalists Career Achievement Award, four James Madison Freedom of Information Awards from SPJ, and the Edward R. Murrow Award for Investigative Journalism.

De Wolk and Leslie Griffith won a Casey Award from the Journalism Center on Children & Families at the University of Maryland for their 1998 KTVU investigative news story called "Candy Kids", about the exploitation of children in violation of labor laws in selling candy. The citation called it a "provocative report on a subject rarely examined. It showed true enterprise and initiative and followed up with additional reporting. It provided the children’s perspective looking at a story that affects minority children not only in this community but elsewhere."

He was an investigative journalist in a collaborative, multimedia storytelling project, called "The Price of Prosperity", which was produced in partnership between KTVU, the San Francisco Chronicle, SFGate.com and Bayinsider.com. The project received a grant award from the Pew Center for Public Journalism in 2001.

De Wolk won a James Madison Award in 2008 for digging into public records about the Metropolitan Transportation Commission's loss of income from drivers who obstruct the collection of fees for using its FasTrak system on bridges.

== KTVU-TV ==
In July 2013, De Wolk was employed as a producer with KTVU-TV, when the station's news team broadcast false and racially insensitive names of pilots involved in the July 2013 Asiana airplane crash at San Francisco International Airport. Anchor Tori Campbell read all four fake names on air. The names had reportedly been emailed to De Wolk by a trusted source and he forwarded them to the newsroom with the warning "you'd better check these out." The names were confirmed by the National Transportation Safety Board before they were aired but the NTSB later apologized and said the mistaken confirmation had been given by a summer intern "acting outside the scope of his authority". Three other producers were fired by KTVU after the incident. De Wolk retained legal counsel and took action against KTVU. The station quickly settled, issuing a statement that De Wolk and KTVU had "reached an amicable agreement" but details were not released.

Earlier in 2013, Electronic Frontier Foundation technologist Micah Lee claimed that De Wolk interviewed him for KTVU on the subject of doxing and its free speech implications but inserted quotes from that interview in a story that aired on the subject of swatting, which Lee says was not discussed during the interview. The story was routinely removed from KTVU's website as were all such stories on KTVU servers as company policy for server space. The Executive Producer issued a statement to the EFF stating that after reviewing the raw tapes of the interview the station "unequivocally stands by its story."

== Publications ==
- Gary Kauf and Roland De Wolk, Our Town: 50 Terrific Bay Area Escapes (Chronicle, 1995)
- Roland De Wolk (text) and John Swain (photographs), Northern California's Best Family Campgrounds: 50 Fun, Affordable, Kid-Friendly Sites (Chronicle, 1997)
- Roland De Wolk, Introduction to Online Journalism: Publishing News and Information (Pearson, 2000).
- Roland De Wolk, American Disruptor: The Scandalous Life of Leland Stanford, 2019.

== Personal ==
De Wolk is a graduate of UC Berkeley, and lives in the San Francisco Bay Area with his wife, Politico senior reporter Carla Marinucci, and two sons.
