= Edward Grover =

American film, stage and television actor

- Publicity Photo of Edward Grover
- Born: Edward D. Grover; October 23, 1932; Huntington Park, California, U.S.
- Died: November 22, 2016 (aged 84); Rolling Hills Estates, California, U.S.
- Education: University of Toledo; University of Texas at Austin
- Occupations: Film, stage and television actor
- Years active: 1959–2008
- Spouse: Brita Grover

Edward D. Grover (October 23, 1932 – November 22, 2016) was an American film, stage and television actor. He was perhaps best known for playing Tony Baretta's supervisor Lieutenant Hal Brubaker in the American detective television series Baretta.

== Life and career ==
Grover was born in Huntington Park, California, the son of Edna (nee Rhoads) and Abram Dee Grover. After living in Colorado and Illinois, Grover attended DeVilbiss High School in Toledo where he graduated in 1950. After serving in the Korean War from 1954 to 1956 Grover was awarded a bachelor's degree by the University of Toledo in 1957, and received a scholarship for postgraduate study at the University of Texas at Austin in 1958. He graduated from the American Shakespeare Festival Academy before studying theatre at Juilliard School. He began his acting career in 1959. He performed with the repertory theatre, Oregon Shakespeare Festival, and also with the McCarter Company and at Antioch College Shakespeare Festival.

Grover guest-starred in television programs including The Jeffersons, Archie Bunker's Place, The Ropers, One Day at a Time, Hill Street Blues, Quincy, M.E., The Greatest American Hero, The A-Team, Fantasy Island and Hart to Hart. He starred in the 1973 film Who?, where Grover played Finchley. He played Lawyer, Adam Reynolds in the soap opera television series The Doctors. He appeared in the films Death Wish, Serpico (as Inspector Lombardo), Law and Disorder and Report to the Commissioner. He retired from acting in 2008.

Grover was also known for voice-over work for iconic commercials such as the 1984 Apple Macintosh introduction, Visa's "Everywhere" campaign, Delta Air Lines, and Nissan advertising.

Grover died in November 2016 in Rolling Hills Estates, California, at the age of 84.
