= Anya Major =

English athlete, actress, model and singer

- Born: 1960 (age 65–66); United Kingdom
- Notable work: Apple Computer's "1984" commercial. "Nikita" music video (Nikita)
- Spouse: Kim Rajah
- Children: 3

Anya Major (born 1960) is an English athlete, actress, model and singer who starred in Apple Computer's "1984" commercial and, in 1985, appeared as "Nikita" in the video to Elton John's song of the same name.

== Career ==
=== "1984" advertisement ===
In 1983, the Chiat/Day advertising agency held a casting call in London, on behalf of their client, Apple Computer, for what would prove to be a landmark television commercial. The vision of the agency and director Ridley Scott stipulated an actress capable of running up to a large video screen, spinning with a sledgehammer, and releasing it at the video screen. Most of the models and actresses tested struggled to do this; one errant throw nearly struck a passerby at the Hyde Park casting call. Anya Major, however, won the role with her ability to handle the hammer convincingly.

The commercial officially aired only twice on American television. It was first screened in December 1983, right before the 1:00 am sign-off on KMVT in Twin Falls, Idaho, so that it would be eligible for advertising industry awards for that year. In addition, starting on January 17, 1984 it was screened prior to previews in movie theaters for a few weeks. Its best-known appearance was just after half-time of Super Bowl XVIII on 22 January 1984. Even with these limited appearances, the ad created such a media frenzy that it gained many subsequent free TV airings and print mentions, as it was discussed in the media.

=== "Nikita" music video ===
Major later portrayed "Nikita" in the Elton John 1985 music video for his song of the same name. As a spin-off, she released a single named "Moscow Nights" using the name Anya, and with that name, in 1987, she released another song named "One Word".

== Later life ==
In 2006, Andy Hertzfeld of the Macintosh development team incorrectly stated that Major had died of breast cancer in 2000. As of 2009, she was living in England with her husband Kim Rajah and their three children. More recently in 2016, fragments of the famed Macintosh commercial were shown in the documentary "Silicon Cowboys" produced by Jason Cohen.
