= Pencil Test (film) =

- Distributed by: Apple Computer
- Release date: July 1988 (SIGGRAPH)
- Running time: 3 minutes
- Country: United States
- Language: English

Pencil Test is a 1988 short film created by Apple Inc.'s Advanced Technology Graphics Group to showcase the animation capabilities of Apple's Macintosh II computer line.

== Plot ==
A pencil tool escapes from the Macintosh interface when no one can see it, as it wants to take a closer look at a wooden pencil on the same desk as the computer. Afterwards, it attempts to get back onto the screen but the computer has been turned off by an unseen human presence. The pencil tool finally manages to turn on the computer, but when it tries to return to the software programme, it ends up smacking onto the screen. After the credits, the sound of the screen shattering can be heard.

== Production credits ==
The credits for the short film include Pixar directors John Lasseter, Andrew Stanton, as well as Ratatouille producer Galyn Susman.
