= Lugz =

Footwear brand

- Type: Subsidiary
- Industry: Fashion
- Founded: 1993
- Headquarters: New York City, U.S.
- Products: Shoes
- Parent: Jack Schwartz Shoes, LLC.
- Website: http://lugz.com/

Lugz is an American footwear brand owned by Jack Schwartz Shoes, LLC (JSS). The brand was established in October 1993, and produces footwear for adults and children.

== History ==
Following the launch of its first boot line, Lugz began collaborations within the music, entertainment, and sports industries. Endorsement and collaboration agreements involved figures and organizations including Snoop Dogg, Bryan "Baby" Williams, Orange County Choppers, and professional athletes from MMA and combat sports.

In February 2000, Lugz launched its website, allowing customers to make direct online purchases.

In 2006, Lugz collaborated with Orange County Choppers, including the design of The Torx, created with Paul Teutul Jr. That same year, Orange Country Choppers and Lugz collaborated on a custom Lugz chopper. In 2009, the chopper was presented to the Bluff Poker Player of The Year.

In 2008, Lugz signed Mixed Martial Arts fighters Lyoto Machida and Houston Alexander as endorsers. The brand later signed additional endorsers such as Quinton “Rampage” Jackson and Cain Velasquez, who became a Lugz endorser in 2010.

During the 2010s, Lugz participated in several collaborative projects with fashion brands, artists, and media entities, like Atelier New Regime, Fool’s Gold Records, Urban Outfitters, V-Files, Colm Dillane (KidSuper), the Swedish rock band Ghost, and Bazooka chewing gum.
