= Lemmings (advertisement) =

1985 Apple Inc. television commercial

Lemmings is a television commercial produced by the Chiat/Day advertising agency that launched the "Macintosh Office" by Apple Computer in the United States, in January 1985, a year after the introduction of the Apple Macintosh in 1984. It was aired during the 1985 Super Bowl, a year after Apple's previous Super Bowl commercial, 1984. The Lemmings commercial was a major failure, unlike 1984, and was widely seen as insulting to potential customers. Apple did not air another commercial during the Super Bowl until the Hal commercial in 1999.

The advertisement's name refers to an urban legend that lemmings periodically commit mass suicide. To the soundtrack of a whistled, discordant and down-tempo version of "Heigh-Ho", a long line of blindfolded office workers slowly makes its way through a dusty, windswept landscape to a cliff, where one by one they fall to their doom. A voiceover notes that the "Macintosh Office" will soon be announced. The last person in the line stops at the brink, uncovers his eyes and takes in the situation, as the announcer states "you can look into it". A second line of people is then shown, as the announcer continues, "or you can go on with business as usual".
