= Lee Clow =

American advertising executive

- Born: 1943 (age 82–83); Los Angeles, California, US
- Education: Santa Monica College, California State University, Long Beach
- Occupation: Advertising executive
- Employer: TBWA\Worldwide
- Known for: 1984 Apple ad, Think Different campaign
- Notable work: Apple campaigns, Energizer Bunny, PlayStation, Taco Bell chihuahua
- Title: Chairman and Global Director; Former Chief Creative Officer

Lee Clow (born 1943) is the chairman and global director of TBWA\Worldwide, and had been its chief creative officer. Advertising Age referred to him as "advertising's art director guru".

== Early life ==
Lee Clow was born in Los Angeles, California, US. He studied at Santa Monica City College and California State University, Long Beach.

== Career ==
Clow is best known for co-creating – along with Steve Hayden – Apple Computer's 1984 commercial, which launched the Apple Macintosh and the "Think Different" slogan. The 60-second TV spot was made for a budget of $900,000 and is considered a masterpiece in advertising.

He is also known for his work on the PlayStation, Energizer Bunny, Taco Bell chihuahua, and California Cooler campaigns. Clow has helmed campaigns for Nissan and Pedigree Petfoods.

== Personal life ==
He was a personal friend of Steve Jobs for 30 years.
