= Carla Marinucci =

American journalist

- Education: San Jose State University (BA); National Autonomous University of Mexico
- Occupation: Journalist
- Spouse: Roland De Wolk
- Children: 2

Carla Marinucci is an American journalist working for Politico covering California politics. Formerly of the San Francisco Chronicle, she specialized in California state gubernatorial politics and national politics.

== Education ==
Marinucci earned a Bachelor of Arts degree in journalism from San Jose State University. She also studied Latin American economics and history at the National Autonomous University of Mexico.

== Career ==
Marinucci has spent much of her career covering California politics, and has also covered business and crime in the past for the Contra Costa Times and The San Francisco Examiner. She has won more than two dozen national and state awards. Marinucci has broken numerous national political news stories, including about California Governor Arnold Schwarzenegger. She appears frequently on the PBS show This Week in Northern California and been a guest on Hardball with Chris Matthews. She has provided political analysis on KQED-FM and was featured on the Ronn Owens Show on KGO.

She received international attention in April 2011 after posting a video on the internet of Barack Obama saying US Army Private Chelsea Manning (then known as Bradley) "broke the law". Supporters of Manning accused Obama of jeopardizing Manning's chances of receiving a fair trial. Marinucci was punished by the White House, which withdrew her privileges. The San Francisco Chronicle accused the White House of a "credibility gap on press coverage".

== Personal life ==
Marinucci is married to fellow Bay Area journalist Roland De Wolk and has two sons.
