= TBWA\Chiat\Day =

American advertising agency

- Company type: Division
- Industry: Advertising
- Predecessors: TBWA; Chiat/Day
- Founded: 1995; 31 years ago
- Headquarters: Chiat/Day Building, Venice, Los Angeles, California, United States
- Parent: TBWA Worldwide
- Website: tbwachiatday.com

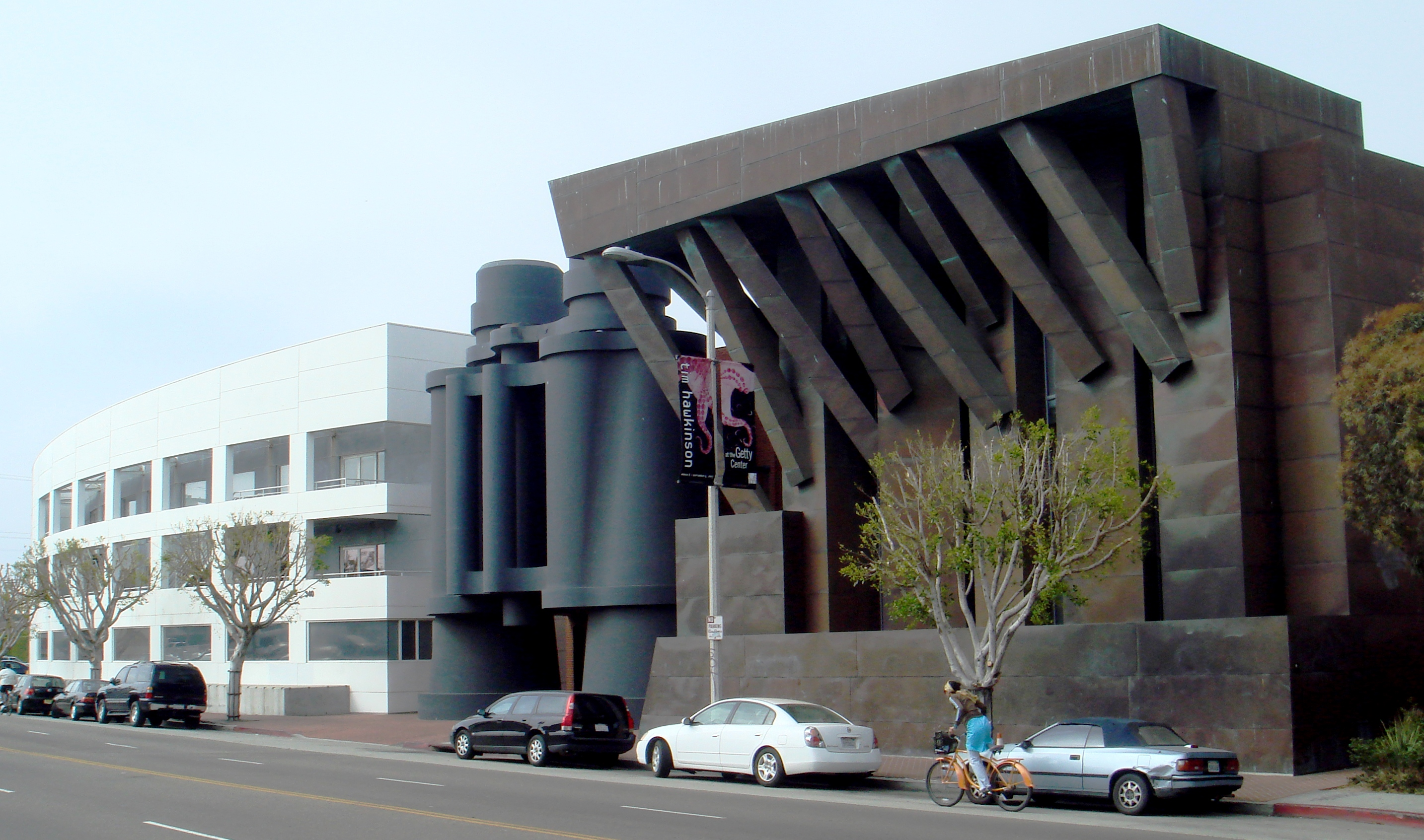
Former Chiat/Day headquarters, the Chiat/Day Building in the Venice neighborhood of Los Angeles, California. Currently occupied by Google.

TBWA\Chiat\Day (/ˈtʃaɪ.æt/ CHY-at) is the American division of the advertising agency TBWA Worldwide. Created as a result of the 1995 merger of TBWA and Chiat/Day, the agency operates offices in Los Angeles, New York City, Nashville, and Mexico City. Prior to the merger, Chiat/Day created internationally notable advertising, including "1984" for Apple Computer, the advertisement that introduced the Macintosh computer. The merger also inspired the creation of the ad agency St.Lukes by Chiat/Day's London office's employees.

TBWA Worldwide is part of the global marketing group Omnicom, with a reputation for more quirky or "disruptive" work. The youngest network in the group's portfolio, TBWA expanded rapidly in the final years of the 1990s and is a competitor to BBDO and DDB. A significant step came in 1998 when the agency absorbed Anglo-French marketing network GGT BDDP.

The current president of the Los Angeles office is Courtney Nelson; the New York office is headed by Rob Schwartz.

== Portfolio ==
- "1984" (1983)
- "Lemmings" (1984)
- PowerBook 100 campaign with Kareem Abdul-Jabbar (1991)
- Dan & Dave (1992)
- "If only they'd used a Jiffi condom" (1993)
- Jack Box (1993)
- the ImagiNation Network (1993 or 1994)
- Crash Bandicoot (1996)
- Final Fantasy VII "$20 Million Campaign" (1997)
- "Think Different" campaign (1997)
- Taco Bell chihuahua (1997)
- Bloody Roar (1997)
- Bloody Roar II: The New Breed (1999)
- Gran Turismo 2 (1999)
- Pets.com sock puppet (1999)
- Hummingbird (television ad) Infiniti I35 (2001)
- Switch (2002)
- Absolut Vodka's "Absolut Marilyn" campaign (2005)
- Keep a Child Alive's "Spirit of a Child" campaign (2005)
- Hello Tomorrow (2005)
- "Get a Mac" campaign (2006)
- Gatorade "G" logo (2009)
- Theranos (2012)
- Southwest Airlines' "Welcome Aboard" campaign (2013)
- University of Phoenix (2019)

== See also ==
- Lee Clow
- Jay Chiat
- Guy Day
