= Livingston Public Schools =

School district in Essex County, New Jersey, US

Coordinates: 40.787733°N 74.340283°W

Address
- 11 Foxcroft Drive Livingston, Essex County, New Jersey, 07039; United States

District information
- Grades: PreK to 12
- Superintendent: Daniel Fishbein (interim)
- Business administrator: Jessica Rapp
- Schools: 9

Students and staff
- Enrollment: 6,056 (as of 2019–20)
- Faculty: 492.6 FTEs
- Student–teacher ratio: 12.3:1

Other information
- District Factor Group: I
- Website: www.livingston.org
Ind.	Per pupil	District spending	Rank (*)	K–12 average	%± vs. average
1A	Total Spending	$19,225	65	$18,891	1.8%
1	Budgetary Cost	14,385	48	14,783	−2.7%
2	Classroom Instruction	8,866	58	8,763	1.2%
6	Support Services	2,295	51	2,392	−4.1%
8	Administrative Cost	1,604	76	1,485	8.0%
10	Operations & Maintenance	1,277	15	1,783	−28.4%
13	Extracurricular Activities	298	71	268	11.2%
16	Median Teacher Salary	82,280	99	64,043
Data from NJDoE 2014 Taxpayers' Guide to Education Spending. *Of K–12 districts with more than 3,500 students. Lowest spending=1; Highest=103

The Livingston Public Schools is a comprehensive community public school district that serves students in pre-kindergarten through twelfth grade from Livingston, in Essex County, in the U.S. state of New Jersey. The district consists of six elementary schools, grades PreK/K–5; one middle school for grade 6 and another middle school for grades 7 and 8, and one four-year high school.

As of the 2020–21 school year, the district, comprised of nine schools, had an enrollment of 6,056 students and 492.6 classroom teachers (on an FTE basis), for a student–teacher ratio of 12.3:1.

The district is classified by the New Jersey Department of Education as being in District Factor Group "I", the second-highest of eight groupings. District Factor Groups organize districts statewide to allow comparison by common socioeconomic characteristics of the local districts. From lowest socioeconomic status to highest, the categories are A, B, CD, DE, FG, GH, I and J.

== Awards and recognition ==
For the 1997-98 school year, Livingston High School received the National Blue Ribbon Award of Excellence from the United States Department of Education, the highest honor that an American school can achieve.

The district's high school was the 16th-ranked public high school in New Jersey out of 339 schools statewide in New Jersey Monthly magazine's September 2014 cover story on the state's "Top Public High Schools", using a new ranking methodology. The school had been ranked 24th in the state of 328 schools in 2012, in New Jersey Monthly magazine's September 2010 cover story on the state's "Top Public High Schools", after being ranked 20th in 2008 out of 316 schools. Livingston High School was the 14th-ranked public high school in New Jersey out of 316 schools statewide, in New Jersey Monthly magazine's September 2006 cover story on the state's Top Public High Schools.

The school was ranked 1038th nationwide, the 33rd-highest in New Jersey, in Newsweek magazine's 2010 rankings of America's Best High Schools based solely on the efforts among 27,000 US schools in making Advanced Placement, International Baccalaureate or Cambridge (AICE) tests available to all students.

The district was among 367 school districts in the US to receive AP District of the Year Awards in the 2nd Annual Honor Roll and among 539 districts in the 3rd Annual Honor Roll.

=== FemGineers ===
FemGineers (Female Engineering Club) is a program in Heritage Middle School to encourage female students to participate in STEM fields (Science, Technology, Engineering, and Mathematics). The program was founded with 10 eight-grade girls to participate in engineering-based competitions. In the five-year period after the establishment of the program, the size of participant increased to 60 girls. The Board of Education of the Livingston Public Schools also supported the initiative by the mean of funding its technology lab. A review in 2013 by the American School Board Journal found that the program resulted in an improvement in standardized math test scores and more female students continued to enroll in higher-level math classes when they enter Livingston High School. However, the future career decisions for those participants are still yet to be seen. The journal awarded the program as one of the winners of the 2013 Magna Awards in the category of public school districts with 5,000 to 20,000 enrollments in the United States.

Additionally, the National School Boards Association listed the FemGineers program and the technology teacher in its "20 to Watch" in 2013 citing the program's attempt to address the gender equality concern in STEM initiatives.

== Competitions ==
Livingston's schools participate in many county, interschool, state, and national competitions. Highlights of the accomplishments are:

=== Arts and literature ===
- Harrison Elementary School and Mount Pleasant Middle School students won first place in the 2007 National Kids-in-Print Book Contest for Students and Essex County Poster Contest.
- Finalist of 2009 Cray-Pas Wonderful, Colorful World Contest
- A student was a winner of the Third Arts Olympiad and was selected to represent New Jersey in 2007 World Children's Festival
- Elementary school students were winners of 2004, 2006 and 2007 Reading Rainbow Young Writers and Illustrators Contest
- Livingston High School students won first-place awards in Pascrell Congressional Art Contest and Ducret School of Art Annual High School Student Art Show.
- In 2008, 2010 and 2012, Livingston High School students were selected to be part of the 120-member National High School Honors Orchestra that performs biennially at the American String Teachers Association National Conference.

=== Business and law ===
- Elementary schools have been consistent winners of New Jersey State Bar Foundation Law Fair Mock Trial Competitions for grade 3 to 6. Riker Hill, Mount Pleasant, Harrison and Collins were winners of the competitions in 2000–2002, 2006–2010, and 2012–2013.
- Livingston High School students were winners from 2008 to 2012 at Future Business Leaders of America National Leadership Conference. In 2012, national first place in Economics and Sport Management, and seventh place in Entrepreneurship.

=== General knowledge ===
- Mount Pleasant Middle School was first place national winner of Knowledge Master Open in 2007 and fourth place national winner in 2008
- Heritage Middle School ranked #1 in New Jersey for Spring 2011 Knowledge Master Open. It was also ranked #19 out of 604 middle schools in the United States and other countries.
- Livingston High School received recognition for its AP Program as a 2006-2007 State High School winner of the Seimen's Award for Advanced Placement

=== Math ===
- Mount Pleasant Middle School ranked #2 out of 204 schools in 6th grade in 2008-2009 New Jersey Mathematics League contest
- Heritage Middle School was national first-place winner in the Continental Mathematics League/Euclidean Divisions 7 and 8
- Livingston High School ranked #1 in the league for the 2012 New Jersey Mathematics League contest
- Livingston High School has been consistent first-place winner of Essex County Math League from 1989 to 2009

=== Science ===
- Mount Pleasant Middle School was ranked #2 in Northern New Jersey region in 2009 New Jersey Science Olympiad
- Heritage Middle School ranked #5 and #7 nationally in the Life Science and General Science respectively in National Science League
- Livingston High School was placed first in the state in Integrated and Advanced Integrated Science in 2008 Merck State Science Day
- Livingston High School has been the Northern New Jersey Regional Champion of New Jersey Science Olympiad from 2004 to 2009. Livingston school district is one of the only three districts that have both middle and high schools in top ten of State Championship Tournament in 2009.
- Livingston High School has produced 4 semifinalists and 1 finalist for the Intel Science Talent Search between 2008 and 2012
- A semi-finalist for the Google Science Fair in 2011
- National Winner in the 2009 Siemens Competition in Math, Science and Technology. A regional finalist in 2010.
- A national finalist at 2012 USA Biology Olympiad
- National Honors since 2010 in United States National Chemistry Olympiad. Two of the top twenty students in the US in 2012 were from Livingston High School.
- Regional finalists at Young Epidemiology Scholars Competition in 2007-08 and 2010-11

=== Technology ===
- Heritage Middle School was a finalist in the National Technology Student Association Conference.
- Heritage Middle School teams were winners in regional Future City Competition
- Livingston High School's robotics team won at 2010-2011 FIRST Tech Challenge World Championship
- A team from Livingston High School competed in 2012 Shell Eco-marathon Americas among other high-school and university teams. Ranked 6th among high school teams in the Gasoline Powered Prototype category.
- Livingston Public School is a winner of the 2013 Magna Awards by American School Board Journal for its female engineering club.

=== World language ===
- Heritage Middle School students scored third and seventh in the nation for the 2011 National French Contest. Livingston High School students scored up to the third in the nation.
- Twenty-eight Livingston High School students placed in the top 10 positions in the state for the 2011 National Spanish Examinations

== Schools ==
Schools in the district (with 2020–21 enrollment data from the National Center for Education Statistics) are:

Elementary schools

- Burnet Hill Elementary School (433; Grade PreK-5)
  - Lisa Barreto, principal
- Collins Elementary School (452; Grade K-5)
  - Michelle Cebula, principal
- Amos W. Harrison Elementary School (453; grade K-5)
  - Daniel Garcia, principal
- Hillside Elementary School (386; K-5)
  - Carlos Gramata Jr., principal
- Mount Pleasant Elementary School (412; Grade K-5)
  - Lorena Dolan, principal
- Riker Hill Elementary School (405; Grade K-5)
  - . Justin Toomey, principal

Middle schools

- Mount Pleasant Middle School (486; Grade 6)
  - Bronawyn O'Leary, principal
- Heritage Middle School (1,029; Grade 7 and 8)
  - Shawn Kelly, principal

High school

- Livingston High School (1,947;Grade 9-12)
  - Danielle Rosenzweig, principal

== Administration ==
Core members of the district's administration are:

- Daniel Fishbein, interim superintendent
- Jessica Rapp, business administrator and board secretary

== Board of education ==
The district's board of education is comprised of five members who set policy and oversee the fiscal and educational operation of the district through its administration. As a Type II school district, the board's trustees are elected directly by voters to serve three-year terms of office on a staggered basis, with either one or two seats up for election each year held (since 2012) as part of the November general election. The board appoints a superintendent to oversee the district's day-to-day operations and a business administrator to supervise the business functions of the district.
