= Livingston High School (New Jersey) =

High school in Essex County, New Jersey, US

Location
- 30 Robert Harp Drive; Livingston, Essex County, New Jersey 07039; United States; 40°47′03″N 74°19′13″W

Information
- Type: Public high school
- Motto: A Tradition of Excellence
- School district: Livingston Public Schools
- NCES School ID: 340882002126
- Principal: Amro Mohammed
- Faculty: 187.4 FTEs
- Grades: 9–12
- Enrollment: 2,081 (as of 2024–25)
- Student to teacher ratio: 11.1:1
- Campus type: Suburban
- Colors: Forest green and white
- Athletics conference: Super Essex Conference (general); North Jersey Super Football Conference (football)
- Team name: Lancers
- Rival: Millburn High School
- Accreditation: Middle States Association of Colleges and Schools
- Newspaper: The Lance
- Yearbook: Crossroads
- Website: lhs.livingston.org

Livingston High School is a four-year comprehensive public high school that serves students in ninth through twelfth grades from Livingston, in Essex County, in the U.S. state of New Jersey, operating as part of the Livingston Public Schools. It receives all eighth grade graduates from Heritage Middle School and is the district's only high school. The school has been accredited by the Middle States Association of Colleges and Schools Commission on Elementary and Secondary Schools since 1958.

Livingston High School offers 28 Advanced Placement (AP) courses within eight department areas. The school's principal is Amro Mohammed; his administration team includes three assistant principals.

As of the 2024–25 school year, the school had an enrollment of 2,081 students and 187.4 classroom teachers (on an FTE basis), for a student–teacher ratio of 11.1:1. There were 33 students (1.6% of enrollment) eligible for free lunch and 13 (0.6% of students) eligible for reduced-cost lunch.

== Building and facilities ==
In 2011, LHS completed a $50 million renovation and expansion project featuring a new science wing, orchestra room, atrium and a “fitness and wellness center” (gymnasium with weight room). The cafeteria, auditorium, digital design room, freshmen locker room, and TV studio were also refurbished. Existing areas of the building, originally built in 1953, were upgraded with new technology including, a new security system, centralized HVAC, a fire safety system as well as new audio-visual equipment for every class room. The project was paid for with the proceeds of a $51.5 million bond issue approved in a 2005 referendum and included the addition and renovation of more than 160,000 square feet (15,000 m^{2}) of space.

== Demographics ==
As of the 2023–2024 school year, the student body was 52.1% White, 35.2% Asian, 4.9% Hispanic, 4.5% African American, and 2.9% Two or more races.

== Awards, recognition and rankings ==
For the 1997–98 school year, Livingston High School was recognized with the National Blue Ribbon Award of Excellence from the United States Department of Education, the highest honor that an American school can achieve.

In its listing of “America's Best High Schools 2016,” the school was ranked 383rd out of 500 best high schools in the country; it was ranked 44th among all high schools in New Jersey and 27th among the state's non-magnet schools.

The school was ranked 9th in New Jersey, 3rd among non-magnet schools, and 142nd in the nation in the Newsweek 2013 report on “America's Best High Schools.” The school was ranked 153rd in the nation and 13th in New Jersey on the list of “America's Best High Schools 2012” prepared by The Daily Beast / Newsweek, with rankings based primarily on graduation rate, matriculation rate for college and number of Advanced Placement / International Baccalaureate courses taken per student, with lesser factors based on average scores on the SAT / ACT, average AP/IB scores and the number of AP/IB courses available to students. Prior to 2011, Newsweek used a different methodology with calculation derived only from a single factor. In Newsweek's June 8, 2009, issue, ranking the country's top high schools, Livingston High School was listed as the 25th-highest ranked school in New Jersey. The ranking was calculated using one main factor that is the ratio of Advanced Placement, International Baccalaureate or Cambridge tests given at a school.

The school was the 8th-ranked public high school in New Jersey out of 305 schools statewide in New Jersey Monthly magazine's September 2018 cover story on the state's “Top Public High Schools,” using a new ranking methodology. The school had been ranked 24th in the state of 328 schools in 2012, after being ranked 22nd in 2010 out of 322 schools listed. The magazine ranked the school 20th in 2008 out of 316 schools. The school was ranked 14th in the magazine's September 2006 issue, which included 316 schools across the state.

Livingston High School has a history of success in academics and the arts. Recent accomplishments are:

- Ranked #1 and #2 in the league for the 2012 and 2013 New Jersey Mathematics League contest.
- As of 2015, the school had been placed 1st overall in the Essex County Math League for the 27th year.
- Ranked #4 in the state in the combined school scores of 2011 Merck State Science Day
- One of the top winners at the state-level tournament of New Jersey Science Olympiad in 2003–2005, 2007–2010, 2012 and 2013
- Livingston High School has produced 6 semifinalists and a finalist for the Intel Science Talent Search between 2008 and 2014
- A semi-finalist for the Google Science Fair in 2011
- Robotics team won at 2010-2011 FIRST Tech Challenge World Championship
- A team competed in Royal Dutch Shell Eco-marathon Americas among other high-school and university teams. Ranked 6th in 2012 and ranked 8th in 2014 among high school teams in the Americas in the Gasoline Powered Prototype category.
- National Winner in the 2009 Siemens Competition in Math, Science and Technology. A regional finalist in 2010.
- A national finalist at 2012 USA Biology Olympiad
- National Honors since 2010 in United States National Chemistry Olympiad. Two of the top twenty students in the US in 2012 were from Livingston High School.
- Regional finalists at the Young Epidemiology Scholars Competition in 2007-08 and 2010-11
- Winners from 2008 to 2012 at Future Business Leaders of America National Leadership Conference. In 2012, national first place in Economics and Sport Management, and seventh place in Entrepreneurship.
- Livingston High School received recognition for its AP Program as a 2006–2007 State High School winner of the Siemen's Award for Advanced Placement
- In 2008, 2010 and 2012, students were selected to be part of the 120-member National High School Honors Orchestra that performs biennially at the American String Teachers Association National Conference.
- Robotics team won the Think Award for best engineering notebook at the 2015 FIRST Tech Challenge
- Two national top 16 debaters at the National Catholic Forensic League Grand National Tournament in Public Forum Debate
- In 2022, the Livingston History Bowl team won the National Championships in the Junior Varsity division. Then in, 2023, the team won the National Championships in the Varsity division.

== Athletics ==
The Livingston High School Lancers compete in the Super Essex Conference, which is comprised of public and private high schools in Essex County and was established following a reorganization of sports leagues in Northern New Jersey by the New Jersey State Interscholastic Athletic Association. Prior to the NJSIAA's 2010 realignment, the school had competed as part of the Iron Hills Conference, which included public and private high schools in Essex, Morris and Union counties. With 1,434 students in grades 10–12, the school was classified by the NJSIAA for the 2019–20 school year as Group IV for most athletic competition purposes, which included schools with an enrollment of 1,060 to 5,049 students in that grade range. The football team competes in the Liberty White division of the North Jersey Super Football Conference, which includes 112 schools competing in 20 divisions, making it the nation's biggest football-only high school sports league. The school was classified by the NJSIAA as Group V North for football for 2024–2026, which included schools with 1,317 to 5,409 students.

The 1972 boys soccer team finished the season with a 20-0 record after winning the Group IV title after defeating Brick Township High School by a score of 2-1 in the tournament final played at Fairleigh Dickinson University.

The boys' tennis team won the Group IV state championships in 1976 (defeating Cherry Hill East High School in the final match of the tournament), 1977 (vs. Watchung Hills Regional High School), 1989 (vs. East Brunswick High School), 2001 (vs. Bridgewater-Raritan High School), 2002 (vs. Cherry Hill East), 2011 (vs. West Windsor-Plainsboro High School South) and 2015 (vs. Westfield High School), and won the Group III title in 1995 vs. Mainland Regional High School. The team won the overall state championship in 1977, defeating Christian Brothers Academy in the tournament final. In 2011, the Livingston boys' tennis team earned their second overall state title when they won the Tournament of Champions over Delbarton School, completing a perfect 36–0 season.

The baseball team won the Group IV state championship in 1976 vs. Bridgeton High School and in 1980 vs. Steinert High School. The team won the Greater Newark Tournament in 1974, 1976, 1977, 1980, 1991, 2009 and 2018. The program's seven titles are the second-most in tournament history. The team won the 2018 Greater Newark Tournament title, defeating Nutley High School 8-3 in the finals.

The ice hockey team was the overall state champion in 1980 and 1982. The team won the Gordon Cup in 1959, 1960, 1973, 1977 and 1981, and won the McInnis Cup in 2013.

The girls’ tennis team won the Group IV state championship in 1998 (defeating Cherry Hill High School East in the tournament final) and 2000 (vs. West Windsor-Plainsboro South High School).

The boys' wrestling team won the North II Group IV state sectional championship in 2003 and in North I Group V in 2022.

The girls' volleyball team won the Group III state championship in 2004 (against runner-up Northern Valley Regional High School at Old Tappan) and won the Group IV title in 2011 (vs. Hunterdon Central Regional High School)

The football team won the 2008 North I, Group IV state sectional title, the program's first, with a 28–8 win over Hackensack High School in a game played at Giants Stadium. As of 2016, the football coach is Robert Breschard.

The girls’ soccer team won the North I Group IV state sectional championship in 2013 with a 1-0 win against Randolph High School in the tournament final.

The girls fencing team was the statewide sabre team winner in 2015–2017.

The boys fencing team won the overall state championship in 2019 and was the sabre team winner that same year.

The men's ice hockey team plays at Richard J. Codey Arena.

== Notable alumni ==
- Jason Alexander (born 1959, class of 1977; né Jay Scott Greenspan), actor, best known for appearing in Seinfeld
- Benjamin August (born c. 1979, class of 1997), casting director and screenwriter
- Hannah August (class of 2001), press secretary for the First Lady Michelle Obama
- Shiva Ayyadurai (born 1963), MIT systems scientist and entrepreneur who developed an email system in 1979 when he was a student at Livingston High School
- Bruce Beck (class of 1974), sportscaster on WNBC
- Elvina Beck (born 1985), founder of the co-living company PodShare
- Frank Biondi (1945–2019, class of 1962), former president and CEO of Viacom, and former chairman and CEO of Universal Studios
- Steven C. Bondy (class of 1980), diplomat who is the nominee to be the United States Ambassador to Bahrain
- Chris Christie (born 1962, class of 1980), former Governor of New Jersey
- Harlan Coben (born 1962, class of 1980), The New York Times best-selling author of Promise Me, Tell No One and No Second Chance,
- Megan Coyne, political communications specialist who serves as the White House Deputy Director of Platforms, where she manages the Twitter account for the White House
- Lucille Davy, Commissioner of the New Jersey Department of Education
- Bob Dukiet (1948-2009), college basketball coach
- Monica Flores (born 1996), American-born Mexican footballer who plays as a left-back for Notre Dame Fighting Irish and for the Mexico women's national team
- Sabrina Flores (born 1996), American-born Mexican footballer who plays as a midfielder for Spanish Primera División club Sevilla FC and was a member of the Mexico women's national team
- Christine Grady (born 1952), nurse and bioethicist who serves as the head of the Department of Bioethics at the National Institutes of Health Clinical Center
- Robert E. Grady (born 1957, class of 1975), an American venture capitalist and investment banker, and a senior-level public official
- Deborah Gramiccioni, lawyer who served as Deputy Executive Director of the Port Authority of New York and New Jersey
- Chelsea Handler (born 1975, class of 1993), American comedian and host of The Chelsea Handler Show and Chelsea Lately
- Nikki M. James (born 1981), Tony-Award-winning actress and singer
- Leslie Kritzer (born 1977, class of 1995), Broadway actress
- Alan Krueger (born 1960, class of 1979), economist who served as the 27th Chair of the Council of Economic Advisers and is currently the Bendheim Professor of Economics and Public Policy at Princeton University
- Sophia Lin, film producer
- Pamela Nadell (born 1951, class of 1969), historian, researcher, author and lecturer focusing on Jewish history
- Steve Nisenson (born c. 1953), basketball player who set Hofstra's all-time scoring record and the national collegiate season free throw percentage record
- Lee Olesky (class of 1980), co-founder of TradeWeb
- Stephen Oremus (born 1971), music supervisor, music director, orchestrator and vocal arranger who won the Tony Award for Best Orchestrations in 2011 for The Book of Mormon and in 2013 for Kinky Boots
- Colleen Patrick-Goudreau (born 1970, class of 1988), author, speaker and podcaster
- Glenn K. Rieth (born 1957, class of 1976), the Adjutant General of New Jersey
- Robert E. Rose (1939–2022, class of 1957), politician who served as the 26th Lieutenant Governor of Nevada, from 1975 to 1979
- Michael Schlossberg (born 1983), member of the Pennsylvania House of Representatives, who has represented the 132nd district since 2013
- Frank Schwindel (born 1992, class of 2010), first baseman for the Chicago Cubs
- Ken Segall (born 1950), author and advertising creative director
- Ron Shaich (born 1953, class of 1971), businessman, entrepreneur, investor and author who founded Panera Bread
- Suzanne Steinbaum (born c. 1968, class of 1986), cardiologist and director of Women's Heart Health at the Heart and Vascular Institute at Lenox Hill Hospital
- Richard Tanne (born 1985), writer, director and producer of the films Southside with You and Chemical Hearts
- Elizabeth Tartakovsky (born 2000, class of 2018), Olympic saber fencer
- Roger Y. Tsien (born 1952), co-winner of the 2008 Nobel Prize in Chemistry and 1968 national winner of the Westinghouse Talent Search
- David Wildstein (born 1961, class of 1979), former mayor of Livingston who served as a senior official in the Port Authority of New York and New Jersey until his resignation in the midst of the scandal involving traffic lanes closures at the George Washington Bridge
- Stan Yagiello (born 1963), former professional football quarterback
- Danny Zuker (born c. 1964, class of 1982) Emmy award-winning writer and producer for Modern Family
