= ICAF =

ICAF may refer to:

- Industrial College of the Armed Forces, a U.S. military educational institution
- International Capoeira Angola Foundation, a capoeira angola group located in Brazil.
- International Child Art Foundation, an international organization on children arts.
- International Comic Arts Forum, an academic conference related to comics
- International Committee on Aeronautical Fatigue and Structural Integrity, a professional association that was formed in 1951.
- Italian Co-Belligerent Air Force, was the air force of the Royalist "Badoglio government" in southern Italy during the last years of World War II.
- The International Commission on the Anthropology of Food and Nutrition, a commission of the International Union of Anthropological and Ethnological Sciences (IUAES).
