= Bamendou Tukah Mask =

The Bamendou Tukah Mask is a material embodiment of traditional power, It represents the values, and authority of the Bamendou people in Cameroon. A fairly explicit piece of literature that reflects how the community is socially and politically organized, while also preserving important aspects of its culture and traditions.

== Cultural significance ==
Tukah Mask represents the spiritual power and authority of the Bamendou guiding the community of its political, judicial, social, cultural, and spiritual life. It is used in traditional rituals where members of the bamendou community seek economic prosperity and well-being.

The Bamendou Tukah Mask is presented to the public on two special occasions: during the enthronement of a new King and as part of a community gathering held every five years, which makes it has a strong connection to the King and his dignitaries. Its sculptural form and the patterns carved into its surface stands as compelling evidence that Africans developed systems of writing to preserve and express knowledge, history, beliefs, and social values.

== History ==
In 1957, the Tukah Mask disappeared from the Bamendou palace leading to the abandonment of the cultural and economic activities that had long revolved, leaving the Bamendou community disconnected from their own identity. Over the years, the effects have shown up in different ways, community members pulling back from development projects in the region, environmental disasters, and even fatal accidents. The mask was taken by Dr. Pierre Harter, a French doctor, who claimed he had been gifted numerous cultural artifacts by various communities across Cameroon as tokens of gratitude for his medical care.

Bamendou's political, spiritual leaders, local scholars, and community members believe that reinstating the Tukah Mask will restore their people's dignity and pride in their identity. They began reviving the Ngim Nu cultural festival, which used to be organized around the Tukah Mask. Through this, they started restoring the cultural practices and rituals that once bonded the community to the mask, also creating a Brother Mask, intended to invite the spirit of the present Tukah to occupy a new vessel, allowing it to find his way home 62 years after.

== Reparation ==
In 2017, Stéphane Martin, former president of the Musée du Quai Branly Jacques Chirac, cited Pierre Harter's Cameroonian sculpture collection as a "non-violent" acquisition, pushing back against scholars Felwine Sarr and Bénédicte Savoy's claims that African heritage was largely taken through colonial-era crimes.

In 2018, His Majesty Tsidie Gabriel, King of Bamendou, tried to negotiate the return of Tukah Mask but was denied by the Louvre Museum, which exhibits the Musée du Quai Branly's collection as part of the Pavillon des Sessions (now the Gallery of Five Continents), he was told restitution could only be discussed state-to-state, and Cameroon's own Ministry of Arts and Culture showed little interest in pursuing it. The King, Community's secret society of advisors and other community members moved forward with plans to restore and commissioned a "brother mask” (also known as a replica) of the original Tukah Mask that was created by local sculptors, which brough about the 54th Ngim Nu festival (25–30 March 2019), an opportunity to celebrate the unity of the Bamendou people through the exhibition of their rich, tangible and intangible heritage. Lastly, it was a festive event based around the ritual and mythical release of the Tukah Mask and an ode to his central organising power.Although the festival was a success, two unusual environmental incident occurred shortly after and spiritual leaders from Bamendou suggested that the original mask was angry for having been abandoned in Paris and replaced by his brother mask, and that they would have to appease the original and transfer his powers to the brother for the Tukah Mask to be truly restored. These incidents confirmed that the lives and livelihoods of Bamendou community members were contingent on the Tukah's state, and it is on this basis that reparations were considered as part of restitution, the harms experienced being attributed to the mask expressing his anger since his taking in 1957. This shifted the focus from permanent return (blocked by France's 2004 Code du Patrimonies, which makes public collections inalienable) to securing a temporary loan in consideration of France's seemingly immovable stance on permanent returns to communities of origin.

In 2021, after fruitless discussions, His Majesty Tsidie Gabriel was contacted by Routes des Chefferies, a prominent association of museums in Cameroon, to see if the Bamendou community would display the brother mask at the Cameroon Cultural Season in Paris the following year. All those involved agreed this was a fantastic opportunity to have the two masks meet, circumventing the troubles they had in formulating a demand for a temporary loan, as having the embodiments meet strengthened the possibility that they could reach an understanding through direct dialogue.

In February 2022, the second ngim nu festival was held, further strengthening the sense of community and raising awareness about the value and restitution of the Tukah Mask. Its popularity reflected both a quest among many Cameroonian peoples, including the Bamendou, to find their true identity, and the Cameroon government's desire to counter acculturation by promoting Cameroon's cultural diversity through tourism.

In June 2022, with the financial support of Association of Bamendou d'Europe, a delegate of His Majesty Tsidie Gabriel, respected elders, traditional religious officers, academics and heritage experts travelled to Paris for a conference and ritual ceremony at the Musée du quai Branly Jacques Chirac, part of the broader Cameroon Cultural Season curated by Cindy Olohou. While at the conference, the Bamendou community discussed with the French, presenting the tragedies endured by the removal of the Tukah Mask and the sum of 155 billion CFA francs was calculated based on the extent of damage caused by the Ngouachie disaster in Bafoussam, an event attributed to the Tukah Mask's wrath, the costs of building roads, schools, health centres, and a museum for Bamendou youth. The demand for a short- to long-term loan was made in light of the fact that Cameroon's museum infrastructure and skill levels could not meet the preservation needs of the Tukah Mask, especially after its years in captivity had altered the climatic conditions the material could withstand.

The ritual ceremony was done by the traditionalist using plant parts, powders, and incantations known only to them to calm the anger of the original Tukah Mask and bring him into conversation with the brother mask, in the hope that he would transfer his powers. However progress remins stalled by several barriers which are: Cameroonian government weak museum infrastructure and conservation capacity. Although Federal Law No. 63-22 of 19 June 1963 organises the protection of monuments, objects and sites of a historical or artistic nature, no accompanying policy systematically applies it. These factors affect the confidence with which the French would send the Tukah Mask to a Cameroonian museum, and lending it directly to the community would contravene the Code du Patrimoine 2004, which specifies that such a loan be negotiated between museums or at the official state level.

In 2022, President Paul Biya announced that an Inter-Ministerial Committee would be established in the Ministry of Culture to coordinate and finalise the restitution demands of various communities in the country. But its work so far has largely focused on Cameroonian belongings and embodiments in Germany, thereby excluding the Tukah Mask case unresolved.

Even without the mask's physical return, the campaign has succeeded in one major way: it has put the Tukah Mask back at the centre of Bamendou identity, reconnecting the community at home and in the diaspora with its heritage and history.
