= Organizing (management) =

Term in management

Organizing, or organization is the establishment of effective authority-relationships among selected works, which often improves efficiency.

== History ==
The organizing of information has taken place since humans learned to write in the 4th millennium BC. Archaeological evidence reveals that the earliest written script developed in southern Mesopotamia around 3200 BC, primarily as an accounting system to keep inventories, track deliveries, and manage livestock. This demonstrates that basic organizational skills have always been tied to geography and communication. In a management context, organizing involves coordinating and arranging information, resources, or people in order to meet an objective.

During the early 20th century was when large companies began to monopolize and capitalism was at its peak. Management and what it meant to be a manager was not a topic at hand for these companies because being a leader was a skill you were born with. However, as time went on during the 20th century new ways of thinking started to emerge from a few important names. Max Weber believed that to run a well organized environment, workers needed to be controlled to work together like a well oiled machine. Henri Fayol was an engineer who developed 14 principals of management; division of work, authority, discipline, unity of demand, unity of direction, subordination of individual interest to the general interests, remuneration, centralization, scalar chain, order, equity, stability of tenure of personnel, initiative, and esprit de corps. He also developed six primary functions of management; forecasting, planning, organizing, commanding, coordinating, controlling. Mary Parker Follett, on the other hand, was a management consultant and American social worker who believed that managers should work with their workers to accomplish their tasks instead of having control over them. She opened the door to relations between managers and workers, and interpersonal relationships in the work place.

== Characteristics ==
The following are the important characteristics of organization:

- Specialization and division of work. The entire philosophy of organization is centered on the concepts of specialization and division of work. The division of work is assigning responsibility for each organizational component to a specific individual or group thereof. It becomes specialization when the responsibility for a specific task lies with a designated expert in that field. The efforts of the operatives are coordinated to allow the process at hand to function correctly. Certain operatives occupy positions of management at various points in the process to ensure coordination.
- Orientation towards goals. Every organization has its own purposes and objectives. Organizing is the function employed to achieve the overall goals of the organization. Organization harmonizes the individual goals of the employees with overall objectives of the firm.
- Composition of individuals and groups. Individuals forms a group and the groups forms an organization. Thus, organization is the composition of individual and groups. Individuals are grouped into departments and their work is coordinated and directed towards organizational goals.
- Continuity. An organization is a group of people with a defined relationship in which they work together to achieve the goals of that organization. This relationship does not come to end after completing each task. Organization is a never ending process.
- Flexibility. The organizing process should be flexible so that any change can be incorporated easily. It ensures the ability to adapt and adjust the activities in response to the change taking place in the external environment. The programs, policies and strategies can be changed as and when required if the provision for flexibility is made in the organizing process.

== Objectives ==
- Helps to achieve organizational goal. Organization is employed to achieve the overall objectives of business firms. Organization focuses attention of individual’s objectives towards overall objectives.
- Optimum use of resources. To make optimum use of resources such as men, material, money, machine and method, it is necessary to design an organization properly. Work should be divided equally and qualified people should be given the right jobs to reduce the wastage of resources in an organization.
- To perform managerial function. Planning, organizing, staffing, directing and controlling cannot be implemented without proper organization.
- Facilitates growth and diversification. A good organization structure is essential for expanding a business activities. Organization structure determines the input resources needed for expansion of a business activity; similarly organization is essential for product diversification such as establishing a new product line. it also stimulates creativity in managers by organizing.
- Humane treatment of employees. Organization has to operate for the betterment of employees and must not encourage monotony of work due to higher degree of specialization. Now, organization has adapted the modern concept of systems approach based on human relations and it discards the traditional productivity and specialization approach.

== Applications ==
Organizing, is the management function that follows after planning, it involves the assignment of tasks, the grouping of tasks into departments and the assignment of authority with adequate responsibility and allocation of resources across the organization to achieve common goals. Organizing involves the establishment of an intentional structure of roles through determination and enumeration of the activities required to achieve the goals of an enterprise. These roles include, the grouping of these activities, the assignment of such groups of activities to managers, the delegation of authority to carry them out, and the provision for coordination of authority and informal relationships.

=== Structure ===
The framework in which the organization defines how tasks are divided, resources are deployed, and departments are coordinated.

1. A set of formal tasks assigned to individuals and departments.
2. Formal reporting relationships, including lines of authority, decision responsibility, number of hierarchical levels, and span of managers control.
3. The design of systems to ensure effective coordination of employees across departments.

=== Work specialization ===
Work specialization (also called division of labor or job specialization) is the degree to which organizational tasks are sub-divided into individual jobs. The pros to work specialization are that it may increase the efficiency of workers by only having a certain amount of tasks to focus on and complete. Also while becoming more skilled in whichever task they are completing. As opposed to having a large amount of tasks to accomplish and not being able to thoroughly complete those tasks. When split up, it lightens the load on all of the workers, while also giving a chance for them to give their all to said task. However, with too much specialization, employees may feel isolated and bored. Many organizations enlarge jobs or rotate assigned tasks to provide greater challenges.

Chain of Command Chain of command is used for the purposes of overall responsibility and accountability in achieving the stated goals and objectives through the use of orders and reports. This is shown graphical through vertical lines that represent order in one direction and reports of compliance in the other direction. Chain of command differs from lines of an organization because lines of an organization most often represent the communication and coordinating lines. These are shown on a graph as horizontal lines of organization. Chain of command (also referred to as 'scalar principle') states that a clear, unbroken chain of command should link every employee with someone at a higher level, all the way to the top of the organization. This helps to maintain authority, responsibility, and accountability.

=== Authority, responsibility, and accountability ===
- Authority is a manager's formal and legitimate right to make decisions, issue orders, and allocate resources to achieve organizationally desired outcomes. A person with authority has the power to give orders, make decisions, and enforce obedience.
- Responsibility means an employee's duty to perform assigned task or activities. A person with a responsibility is someone who is being held accountable or to blame for something.
- Accountability means that those with authority and responsibility must report and justify task outcomes to those above them in the chain of command. Someone with accountability has an obligation to accept responsibility for one's action, and is to blame for any mishaps.

=== Delegation ===
Delegation is the transfer of authority and/or responsibility to others, often lower in position. Delegation can improve flexibility to meet customers’ needs and adapt to competitive environments. Possible reasons for delegation: 1. Efficiency - Amount of time to complete a task can be considerably reduce with multiple people working on it compared to one. 2. Specialization - Allows people with the most qualifications and knowledge to complete a specific and more complex task. 3. Training - Assigning a task to a trainee or new members so they can gain first hand knowledge and experience.

=== Types of authority (and responsibility) ===
- Line authority - managers have the formal power to direct and control immediate subordinates. The superior issues orders and is responsible for the result and the subordinate obeys and is responsible only for executing the order according to instructions.
- Functional authority - is where managers have formal power over a specific subset of activities. For instance, the Production Manager may have the line authority to decide whether and when a new machine is needed but the Controller demands that a Capital Expenditure Proposal is submitted first, showing that the investment will have a yield of at least x%; or, a legal department may have functional authority to interfere in any activity that could have legal consequences. This authority would not be functional but it would rather be staff authority if such interference is "advice" rather than "order".
- Staff authority - is granted to staff specialists in their areas of expertise. It is not a real authority in the sense that a staff manager does not order or instruct but simply advises, recommends, and counsels in the staff specialists' area of expertise and is responsible only for the quality of the advice (to be in line with the respective professional standards etc.) It is a communication relationship with management. It has an influence that derives indirectly from line authority at a higher level.
- Line and Staff Authority - is the combination of Line organization and Staff organization. Such organization follows both the principles of scalar chain of command and there is a provision for specialized activities to be performed by staff officers who act in an advisory capacity

=== Span of management ===
Categories:

- Direct single relationship - A relationship that is easily and clearly recognizable between management and subordinates. This is mostly applicable to private organisations or sole proprietorship
- Direct group relationships - A direct relationship between a supervisor and his subordinates jointly.
- Cross relationship - A mutual relationship between two subordinates.

Factors influencing larger span of management.

1. Work performed by subordinates is stable and routine.
2. Subordinates perform similar work tasks.
3. Subordinates are concentrated in a single location.
4. Subordinates are highly trained and need little direction in performing tasks.
5. Rules and procedures defining task activities are available.
6. Support systems and personnel are available for the managers.
7. Little time is required in non-supervisory activities such as coordination with other departments or planning.
8. Managers' personal preferences and styles favor a large span.

=== Tall versus flat structure ===
- Tall - A management structure characterized by an overall narrow span of management and a relatively large number of hierarchical levels. Tight control. Reduced communication overhead.
- Flat - A management structure characterized by a wide span of control and relatively few hierarchical levels. Loose control. Facilitates delegation.

=== Centralization, decentralization, and formalization ===
Decision making processes are chosen depending on what decision is being made.

- Centralization - The location of decision-making authority near top organizational levels.
- Decentralization - The location of decision-making authority near lower organizational levels.
- Formalization - The written documentation used to direct and control employees.

=== Departmentalization ===
Departmentalization is the basis on which individuals are grouped into departments and departments into total organizations. Approach options include:

1. Functional - By common skills and work task.
2. Divisional - Common product, program or geographical location.
3. Matrix - Combination of Functional and Divisional.
4. Team - To accomplish specific tasks.
5. Network - Departments are independent providing functions for a central core breaker.

Examples of departments in a corporate office may be: production, marketing, finance, human resource, research, development, and more. These departments are sectioned off and organized/managed by the executive of that department. This gives the department more control and efficiency.

== See also ==
- Community organizing
- Order theory
- Outline of management
- Professional organizer
- Sorting
- The organization of the artist
- Union organizer
