= Elvina Beck =

American entrepreneur

- Born: 1985 (age 40–41); Moscow, USSR
- Education: Pepperdine University
- Occupation: Entrepreneur
- Website: Official website

Elvina Beck is an American entrepreneur. She is co-founder and CEO of Californian coliving company PodShare.

== Early life and education ==
Beck was born in Moscow, USSR in 1985. In 1990 Beck emigrated to Brooklyn, New York City with her parents, Elvira and Antony. After an initial period of support from the Russian community in Brooklyn (a period which Beck has credited as formative in her positive views of community and sharing), the family moved to Livingston, New Jersey. Beck was educated at Livingston High School, and Pepperdine University, Malibu, graduating in Political Science in 2008.

=== Transition to videography ===
In her early twenties, growing disaffected with the lack of control over her career that she felt as an actress and model, Beck taught herself how to operate a camera and to edit video. In her career as a camera operator, Beck has worked for, among others, Randi Zuckerberg, Avril Lavigne and Maxim Magazine.

== PodShare ==
In 2012, recognizing the lack of available, short-term housing for transitioners and freelancers, Beck co-founded coliving company PodShare with her father.

The company opened its first location in Hollywood, Los Angeles, and has since added locations in Los Feliz, Arts District, Venice Beach and Westwood in that city. In July 2019, PodShare opened its first location outside of Los Angeles in Tendernob, San Francisco, California.

PodShare has flexible residency, and a floorplan that excludes privacy and forces interactions between guests, which Beck calls "collisions".

== Other pursuits ==
Since 2015, Beck has been president on the Central Hollywood Neighborhood Council. In 2019, she was re-elected to for a second four-year term.

Beck is an advocate for the unsheltered homeless of Los Angeles. In recognition of her ongoing non-profit work to improve the lives of the homeless, as well as the success of her startup PodShare in addressing urban affordability, Beck received the 2020 Stratiscope Impact Makers Award at Los Angeles City Hall on January 29, 2020.
