= International Committee on Aeronautical Fatigue and Structural Integrity =

The International Committee on Aeronautical Fatigue and Structural Integrity (ICAF) was initiated by Dr. Ir. Frederik Plantema, head of the Structures and Materials Department of the National Aeronautical Research Institute (NLL) in Amsterdam, the Netherlands in 1951. Dr. Plantema proposed international collaboration in the field of aeronautical fatigue in response to growing concerns regarding fatigue problems in metal aircraft structures. The first conference of the International Committee on Aeronautical Fatigue (ICAF) was held in Amsterdam in 1952, with participants from the Netherlands, United Kingdom, Sweden, Belgium and Switzerland. ICAF soon got a significant influence on the fatigue research in a large part of the world by suggesting the urgent problems to be studied and joining the efforts of many laboratories in different countries. It is an informal organization that consists of the General Secretary and the National Delegates from the (now) seventeen member countries. In 2010 the name was changed to the present one in order to clarify that the scope of the committee had broadened and now also includes topics such as damage formation and growth in composite structures, structural health and loads monitoring, probabilistic modeling of structural integrity, corrosion control, etc. The acronym ICAF was maintained.

The stated aims of ICAF are to encourage contacts between people actively engaged in aircraft structural integrity problems and to exchange information, experience, opinions and ideas concerning aeronautical fatigue and fatigue-related subjects. To this end a conference and a symposium are organized every two years for attendance by representatives of industry, universities and institutes, military specialists, regulatory agencies and aircraft operators throughout the world. The two-day conference consists of reviews of aeronautical fatigue and other structural integrity activities presented by the National Delegates. It is followed by a three-day symposium for specialist papers presented by authors with design, manufacturing, airworthiness regulations, operations and research backgrounds. The symposium also includes the Plantema Memorial Lecture, delivered by a leading member of the structural integrity community, and the presentation of the Schijve Award to a selected young researcher.

ICAF has no formal constitution or laws or funds. Its activities are possible only by the interest of the member countries and the activities of the National Delegates and the General Secretary, who is elected by the National Delegates from their ranks and is appointed for an indefinite period of time. The appointment of the National Delegates is also permanent. On resignation, a delegate nominates a successor for approval by the other delegates and the General Secretary. The National Delegates usually come from a non-profit research institute, although some delegates have a position in a university or within the aerospace industry.

Participation in the ICAF meetings is open for anybody interested in the topics. More information is provided on ICAF's website: "ICAF".

== Member countries ==
Originally, ICAF started with five member countries only, while other countries were invited to join later. New member countries can still be invited to join ICAF upon agreement of the committee members. The current ICAF member countries are listed below.

- Australia
- Brazil
- Canada
- China
- Finland
- France
- Germany
- Israel
- Italy
- Japan
- Poland
- Russia
- Sweden
- Switzerland
- The Netherlands
- United Kingdom
- United States of America

== Plantema Medal ==
The Plantema Medal has been established by ICAF in 1967. It is a career award that is presented to a selected leading member of the structural integrity community. The award recipient is invited to deliver a keynote lecture at the start of the biennial symposium. This Plantema Memorial Lecture is named after the late Dr. Ir. Frederik Johan Plantema, inspiror, founder and General Secretary of ICAF, from its foundation in 1951 until November 1966 when he untimely passed away. In the first Plantema Memorial Lecture Mr Barrois "(France) stated that "The ICAF is a neutral ground (...). No privilege can disturb the harmony of the members, as there is no nominal President, and the real President, Dr. Plantema, remained a modest secretary and confined himself strictly within this part, however always suggesting the way to follow which was generally agreed to."

== Jaap Schijve Award ==
This biennial award for young and talented academics in the field of aeronautical fatigue has been established in 2007 by Royal Netherlands Aerospace Centre NLR and Delft University in the Netherlands. The award is named after Prof. Jaap Schijve, to celebrate his 80th birthday. It consists of a token and a prize of €5000,=. Recognizing its promotional value, ICAF has offered the opportunity to present the award on the last day of the ICAF symposium. In 2009 the award was presented for the first time.

== International recognition ==
In 2018 ICAF has received the ICAS von Karman Award for International Collaboration in Aeronautics, in recognition of the multi-national world-wide work over almost seven decades to ensure the safe flight of both civil and military aircraft. This award was established in 1980 in memory of Theodore von Karman, a leading figure in the foundation of ICAS, the International Council of the Aeronautical Sciences, and an outstanding proponent of international collaboration in the aeronautical sciences.

A similar prize, the Cristoforo Colombo International Communication Award, was presented to ICAF in 1980 by the City of Genoa in Italy.
