= Center for Excellence in Education =

American non-profit organization

The Center for Excellence in Education (CEE) is an American 501(c)(3) nonprofit organization that seeks to help academically outstanding high school and college students achieve successful careers in science and technology and fulfill leadership roles. CEE administers three programs: the Research Science Institute (RSI), an annual summer research program for 100 of the world's most accomplished high school students held at MIT; the USA Biology Olympiad (USABO), a national biology competition for high school students in the United States; and the Teacher Enrichment Program (TEP), a series of enrichment programs for STEM educators in the United States. CEE is based in McLean, Virginia, a suburb of Washington, D.C.

== History ==
CEE was founded in 1983 by Admiral H.G. Rickover, known as the "Father of the Nuclear Navy," and Joann P. DiGennaro, who has served as the organization's president since its inception.

== Goals ==
The Center aims to keep the United States competitive in science and technology.

All CEE programs are open to students and teachers regardless of race, color, creed, or economic background; the only criterion is academic excellence. CEE's programs—the Research Science Institute and the USA Biology Olympiad—are offered cost-free to students competitively selected for participation.

== Funding sources ==
CEE has received funds from the U.S. Department of State, the U.S. Agency for International Development, the National Science Foundation, the United States Information Agency, the National Endowment for the Humanities, the National Security Agency, the Bureau of Indian Affairs, the Department of Agriculture, the Small Business Administration, and the Department of Energy. Private individuals and corporations, however, provide most of CEE's funding.
