= Think different =

Slogan by Apple Inc

Logo

"Think different" is an advertising slogan used from 1997 to 2002 by Apple. The campaign was created by the Los Angeles office of advertising agency TBWA\Chiat\Day. The slogan has been widely taken as a response to the IBM slogan "Think". It was used in a television advertisement, several print advertisements, and several TV promos for Apple products.

As of 2020, "Think different" was still printed on the back of the box of the iMac, while as of September 2026, it is printed on the list of Mac-related products above the footer on the Mac website.

== Development ==
In 1983, Apple's "1984" Super Bowl advertisement was created by advertising agency Chiat\Day. In 1986, CEO John Sculley replaced Chiat\Day with BBDO. In 1997, under CEO Gil Amelio, BBDO pitched a new brand campaign with the slogan "We're back" to an internal marketing meeting at the then struggling Apple. Reportedly everyone in the meeting expressed approval with the exception of the recently returned Steve Jobs who said "the slogan was stupid because Apple wasn't back [yet]."

Jobs then invited three advertising agencies to present new ideas that reflected the philosophy he thought had to be reinforced within the company he had co-founded. Chiat\Day was one of them.

The script was written by Rob Siltanen with participation of Lee Clow and many others on his creative team. The slogan "Think different" was created by Craig Tanimoto, an art director at Chiat\Day, who also contributed to the initial concept work. The look and feel of the print, outdoor and the photography used was researched, curated, and visually developed by art & design director Jessica (Schulman) Edelstein who, together with Lee Clow, met weekly with Steve Jobs and the team at Apple to hone the campaign in its many forms. Susan Alinsangan and Margaret (Midgett) Keene were also instrumental in developing the campaign further as it progressed and spread throughout the world. The commercial's music was composed by Chip Jenkins for Elias Arts.

The full text of the various versions of this script were co-written by creative director Rob Siltanen and creative director Ken Segall, along with input from many on the team at the agency and at Apple. While Jobs thought the creative concept "brilliant", he originally hated the words of the television commercial, but then changed his mind. According to Rob Siltanen:

Steve was highly involved with the advertising and every facet of Apple's business. But he was far from the mastermind behind the renowned launch spot...While Steve Jobs didn't create the advertising concepts, he does deserve an incredible amount of credit. He was fully responsible for ultimately pulling the trigger on the right ad campaign from the right agency, and he used his significant influence to secure talent and rally people like no one I've ever seen before. Without Steve Jobs there's not a shot in hell that a campaign as monstrously big as this one would get even close to flying off the ground...it got an audience that once thought of Apple as semi-cool, but semi-stupid to suddenly think about the brand in a whole new way.

Craig Tanimoto is also credited with opting for "Think different" rather than "Think differently," which was considered but rejected by Lee Clow. Jobs insisted that he wanted "different" to be used as a noun (i.e., Think "different"), as in "think victory" or "think beauty". He specifically said that "think differently" wouldn't have the same meaning to him. He wanted to make it sound colloquial, like the phrase "think big".

Jobs' connections were crucial to securing the rights to use the likenesses of the subjects selected to be used in the campaign, many of whom had never been featured in advertising or never would have done so with any other company. He personally called the families of Jim Henson and John F. Kennedy and flew to New York City to visit Yoko Ono. For the television narration he called Robin Williams, who was well known to be against appearing in advertising and whose wife refused to forward the call to him. Tom Hanks was also considered, but Richard Dreyfuss was an Apple fan, and ultimately accepted the job.

Two versions of the narration in the television ad were created in the development process: one narrated by Jobs and one by Dreyfuss. Lee Clow argued that it would be "really powerful" for Jobs to narrate the piece, as a symbol of his return to the company and of reclaiming the Apple brand. On the morning of the first air date, Jobs decided to go with the Dreyfuss version, stating that it was about Apple, not about himself.

It was edited at Venice Beach Editorial, by Dan Bootzin, Chiat\Day's in-house editor, and post-produced by Hunter Conner.

Jobs said the following in a 1994 interview with the Santa Clara Valley Historical Association:

When you grow up you tend to get told the world is the way it is and your job is just to live your life inside the world. Try not to bash into the walls too much. Try to have a nice family life, have fun, save a little money.

That's a very limited life. Life can be much broader once you discover one simple fact, and that is - everything around you that you call life, was made up by people that were no smarter than you. And you can change it, you can influence it, you can build your own things that other people can use.

The minute that you understand that you can poke life and actually something will, you know if you push in, something will pop out the other side, that you can change it, you can mold it. That's maybe the most important thing. It's to shake off this erroneous notion that life is there and you're just gonna live in it, versus embrace it, change it, improve it, make your mark upon it.

I think that's very important and however you learn that, once you learn it, you'll want to change life and make it better, cause it's kind of messed up, in a lot of ways. Once you learn that, you'll never be the same again.

The Steve Jobs narration was played at Apple's in-house memorial for him in 2011.

== Formats ==
=== Television ===
Significantly shortened versions of the advertisement script were used in two television advertisements, known as "Crazy Ones", directed by Chiat\Day's Jennifer Golub who also shared the art director credit with Jessica Schulman Edelstein and Yvonne Smith.

The one-minute ad featured black-and-white footage of 17 iconic 20th-century personalities, in this order of appearance: Albert Einstein, Bob Dylan, Martin Luther King Jr., Richard Branson, John Lennon (with Yoko Ono), Buckminster Fuller, Thomas Edison, Muhammad Ali, Ted Turner, Maria Callas, Mahatma Gandhi, Amelia Earhart, Alfred Hitchcock, Martha Graham, Jim Henson (with Kermit the Frog), Frank Lloyd Wright, and Pablo Picasso. The advertisement ends with an image of a young girl opening her closed eyes, as if making a wish. The final clip is taken from the All Around The World version of the "Sweet Lullaby" music video, directed by Tarsem Singh; the young girl is Shaan Sahota, Singh's niece.

The thirty-second advertisement was a shorter version of the previous one, using 11 of the 17 personalities, but closed with Jerry Seinfeld, instead of the young girl. In order of appearance: Albert Einstein, Bob Dylan, Martin Luther King Jr., John Lennon, Martha Graham, Muhammad Ali, Alfred Hitchcock, Mahatma Gandhi, Jim Henson, Maria Callas, Pablo Picasso, and Jerry Seinfeld. This version aired only once, during the series finale of Seinfeld.

Another early example of the "Think different" ads is on February 4, 1998, months before switching the colored Apple logo to solid white, where an ad aired with a snail carrying an Intel Pentium II chip on its back moving slowly, as the Power Macintosh G3 claims that it is twice as fast as Intel's Pentium II Processor.

=== Print ===
Print advertisements from the campaign were published in many mainstream magazines such as Newsweek and Time. Their style was predominantly traditional, prominently featuring the company's computers or consumer electronics along with the slogan.

There was also another series of print ads which were more focused on brand image than specific products. Those featured a portrait of one historic figure, with a small Apple logo and the words "Think different" in one corner, with no reference to the company's products. Creative geniuses whose thinking and work actively changed their respective fields were honored and included: Jimi Hendrix, Richard Clayderman, Miles Davis, Martha Graham, Cesar Chavez, John Lennon, Laurence Gartel, Mahatma Gandhi, Eleanor Roosevelt and others.

=== Posters ===
Promotional posters from the campaign were produced in small numbers in 24-by-36-inch sizes. They feature the portrait of one historical figure, with a small Apple logo and the words "Think different" in one corner. The original long version of the ad script appears on some of them. The posters were produced between 1997 and 1998.

There were at least 29 "Think different" posters created. The sets were as follows:

Set 1

- Amelia Earhart
- Alfred Hitchcock
- Pablo Picasso
- Mahatma Gandhi
- Thomas Edison

Set 2

- Maria Callas
- Martha Graham
- Joan Baez
- Ted Turner
- 14th Dalai Lama (never officially released due to licensing issues and the politically sensitive nature)

Set 3

- Jimi Hendrix
- Miles Davis
- Ansel Adams
- Lucille Ball and Desi Arnaz
- Bob Dylan (Never officially released due to licensing issues)
- Paul Rand

Set 4

- Frank Sinatra
- Richard Feynman
- Jackie Robinson
- Cesar Chavez

Set 5 (The Directors set, never officially released)

- Charlie Chaplin
- Francis Ford Coppola
- Orson Welles
- Frank Capra
- John Huston

In addition, around the year 2000, Apple produced the ten, 11x17 poster set often referred to as The Educators Set, which was distributed through their Education Channels. Apple sent out boxes (the cover of which is a copy of the "Crazy Ones" original TD poster) that each contained 3 packs (sealed in plastic) of 10 small or miniature "Think different" posters.

Educator Set

- Albert Einstein
- Amelia Earhart
- Miles Davis
- Jim Henson
- Jane Goodall
- Mahatma Gandhi
- John Lennon and Yoko Ono
- Cesar Chavez
- James Watson
- Pablo Picasso

During a special event held on October 14, 1998, at the Flint Center in Cupertino California, a limited edition 11" x 14" softbound book was given to employees and affiliates of Apple Computer, Inc. to commemorate the first year of the ad campaign. The 50 page book contained a foreword by Steve Jobs, the text of the original "Think different" ad, and illustrations of many of the posters used in the campaign along with narratives describing each person.

Outdoor advertisement at MacWorld 2000 Tokyo, etc.

- Akira Kurosawa
- Issei Miyake
- Osamu Tezuka
- Akio Morita

== Reception and influence ==
Upon release, the "Think different" Campaign proved to be an enormous success for Apple and TBWA\Chiat\Day. Critically acclaimed, the spot received numerous awards and accolades, including the 1998 Emmy Award for Best Commercial and the 2000 Grand Effie Award for most effective campaign in America.

In retrospect, the new ad campaign marked the beginning of Apple's re-emergence as a marketing powerhouse. In the years leading up to the ad Apple had lost market share to the Wintel ecosystem which offered lower prices, more software choices, and higher-performance CPUs. Worse for Apple's reputation was the high-profile failure of the Apple Newton, a billion-dollar project that proved to be a technical and commercial dud. The success of the "Think different" campaign, along with the return of Steve Jobs, bolstered the Apple brand and reestablished the "counter-culture" aura of its earlier days, setting the stage for the immensely successful iMac all-in-one personal computer and later the Mac OS X (now named macOS) operating system.

The campaign was parodied in an easter egg in the movie Monsters, Inc. with a magazine cover captioned "Scare Different."

== Revivals ==
=== Product packaging ===
Since late 2009, the box packaging specification sheet for iMac computers has included the following footnote:

Macintosh Think different.

In previous Macintosh packaging, Apple's website URL was printed below the specifications list.

The apparent explanation for this inconspicuous usage is that Apple wished to maintain its trademark registrations on both terms – in most jurisdictions, a company must show continued use of a trademark on its products in order to maintain registration, but neither trademark is widely used in the company's current marketing. This packaging was used as the required specimen of use when Apple filed to re-register "Think different" as a U.S. trademark in 2009.

=== macOS ===
Apple has continued to include portions of the "Crazy Ones" text as Easter eggs in a range of places in macOS. This includes the high-resolution icon for TextEdit introduced in Leopard, the "All My Files" Finder icon introduced in Lion, the high-resolution icon for Notes in Mountain Lion and Mavericks and on the new Color LCD preferences menu introduced for MacBook Pro with Retina Display.

=== Apple Color Emoji ===
Several emoji glyphs in Apple's Apple Color Emoji font contain portions of the text of "Crazy Ones", including 1F4CB 'Clipboard', 1F4C3 'Page with Curl', 1F4C4 'Page facing up', 1F4DC 'Scroll', 1F4DD 'Memo', 1F4D1 'Bookmark Tabs', 1F4D6 'Open Book', 1F9FE 'Receipt', and 1FA99 'Coin'.

=== Other media ===
A portion of the text is recited in the trailer for Jobs, a biographical drama film of Steve Jobs' life. Ashton Kutcher, as Jobs, is shown recording the audio for the trailer in the film's final scene.

The 2015 film Steve Jobs depicts a screening of "Crazy Ones" during the unveiling of the iMac G3. In addition to being seen on screen, the campaign is referenced by the story multiple times: The film's fictionalized version of Steve Wozniak compares himself to John Lennon before being visually juxtaposed with Lennon's frame in "Crazy Ones"; a mock-up poster including Alan Turing in the campaign is rejected when Jobs realizes that Turing is not recognizable (allowing another character to comment on the myth that Turing inspired the Apple Logo); and Jobs' daughter Lisa Brennan-Jobs mocks the phrasing of "Think Different" as opposed to the grammatically correct "Think Differently".

The Richard Dreyfuss audio version is used in the introduction of the first episode of The Crazy Ones, a podcast provided by Ricochet, hosted by Owen Brennan and Patrick Jones.

== See also ==
- 1984 Super Bowl ad
- AppleMasters
- Organization of the artist
