= Robert E. Grady =

American venture capitalist

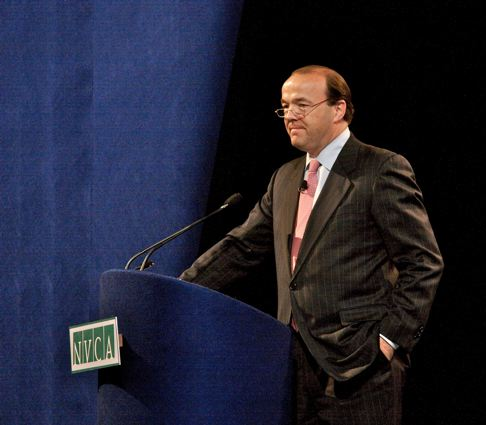

Personal details
- Born: October 1957 (age 68–69) New Jersey, U.S.
- Party: Republican
- Education: Harvard University (BA); Stanford University (MBA)

Robert E. Grady (born October 1957) is an American venture capitalist, private equity investor, and former public official. He has worked at such leading investment firms as Robertson Stephens, The Carlyle Group, and Summit Partners, and for a number of elected officials, including former president George H. W. Bush and New Jersey Governors Tom Kean and Chris Christie.

== Early life and education ==
Grady was born in New Jersey and grew up in Livingston, New Jersey, where he attended Livingston High School, graduating as part of the class of 1975. He graduated cum laude from Harvard College, where he was an editor of the Harvard Crimson. Grady earned a Master of Business Administration from the Stanford Graduate School of Business, where he later served on the faculty for over a decade as a Lecturer in Public Management.

== Career ==
=== Business ===
Grady is currently a partner at Summit Partners, a pioneer in growth private equity investing, where he has served as an Advisory Partner since January 2021, and where he co-led and sits on the Board of Directors of the firm's investment in OTR Capital. He was formerly with Gryphon Investors, a middle-market private equity firm, where he led the firm's Industrial Growth Group and later oversaw Business Development. He has been cited in the press as having led Gryphon's investments in Pacur, Potter Electric Signal Corporation, Transportation Insight, Nolan Transportation Group, and Washing Systems, which was sold to Japan's Kao Corporation in 2018.

Previously, he was a partner at the private equity fund-of-funds Cheyenne Capital, which invested in private equity funds and in private transactions for the State of Wyoming's Permanent Funds. For nearly a decade before that, he was a prominent partner at The Carlyle Group, where he served as Managing Director, member of the Management Committee, and head of Venture and Growth Capital. He was a director of several Carlyle companies, including Blackboard Inc., AuthenTec (which executed an IPO in 2007, and was later sold to Apple Inc.), Wall Street Institute (sold to Pearson PLC), eScreen (sold to Alere Corp.), and Viator (sold to TripAdvisor). During his tenure at Carlyle, Grady also served for six years as a Director and as Chairman of the National Venture Capital Association, which represents more than 400 U.S. venture capital firms. In that role, Grady argued that the United States needed to adopt a strategy to enhance competitiveness, as the previously successful system of investing in higher education, allowing immigration for talented foreign born nationals, and ensuring access to the U.S. capital markets for growing companies was crumbling. In 2011, he gave a TEDx talk on “The Care and Feeding of the Innovation Ecosystem”.

In the 1990s, Grady was a Managing Director and member of the Management Committee at Robertson Stephens, an investment bank focused on growth companies in technology and healthcare, that was acquired by Bank of America and subsequently by BankBoston.

=== Politics ===
Grady began his career as Legislative Assistant and later Administrative Assistant for former U.S. Representative Millicent H. Fenwick (R-NJ). He went on to serve as Director of Communications for former New Jersey Governor Thomas H. Kean. Grady was the chief speechwriter and a senior policy advisor for the George H. W. Bush 1988 presidential campaign, and later served in White House as Associate Director of the Office of Management and Budget ("OMB") for Natural Resources, Energy and Science (1989–1991), Executive Associate Director of the OMB, and Deputy Assistant to the President (1991–1993). He was widely known for advising Bush in the crafting of the Clean Air Act Amendments of 1990.

Noted early in his career by Newsweek as “one of three thirty-somethings to watch” (along with Condoleezza Rice and Robert Zoellick) and the “polished No. 2” at the Office of Management and Budget in George H. W. Bush administration, Grady has emerged over the years as an adviser to various leading Republican candidates and public officials. Grady served as an economic adviser to George W. Bush, Mitt Romney, California Governors Pete Wilson and Arnold Schwarzenegger, Chris Christie of New Jersey, and Matt Mead of Wyoming.

In 2001, President George W. Bush appointed Grady to be a member of the Advisory Committee on Trade and Policy Negotiations, and he was later appointed by the Administrator of NASA to be a member of the NASA Advisory Council's Task Force on the Cost and Management of the International Space Station.

Grady served as a volunteer adviser to his childhood friend Chris Christie during Christie's tenure as Governor of New Jersey and in the Chris Christie 2016 presidential campaign. Grady served as co-chairman and member of Christie's Transition Task Force on Budget and Taxes, as the author of his Inaugural Address and his annual state-of-the-state and budget addresses to Joint Sessions of the Legislature, as Chairman of the New Jersey State Investment Council, which oversees the state's $80 billion pension plan, and as a debate coach, policy advisor and speechwriter for his campaign for the Republican presidential nomination. When Governor Christie began his run for the Presidency, Grady was reported as having coached Christie for the presidential debates as well as being the author of detailed and well-received policy speeches on economic growth, entitlement reform and energy given by Christie.

In Wyoming, Grady has been active as a speaker on the economy, mentor to start-up companies, and organizer of economic growth initiatives. He was a volunteer economic advisor to Wyoming Governor Matt Mead. Today, he is a member of the Wyoming State Banking Board, a Director of the Jackson Hole Mountain Resort, past Chairman of the St. John's Hospital Foundation, and a member of the Investment Committees of both the Community Foundation of Jackson Hole and of the Daniels Fund.

In December 2021, it was reported that Grady is considering running for Congress or Senate from Wyoming. Grady says he has no immediate plans to run, but that he was "very encouraged by Glenn (Younkin)'s victory" in Virginia.

=== Media ===
Grady has appeared frequently in the national media as a spokesman for pro-growth economic policies and as an advocate for strategies to increase the economic competitiveness of the United States. He has published numerous articles and has appeared in the Wall Street Journal, TIME, The Washington Post, the Los Angeles Times, and the San Francisco Chronicle. Grady has appeared on CNBC, Fox Business News, and ABC’s Nightline as a spokesman for growth-oriented economic policies, streamlined regulation, and generally conservative fiscal positions.
