= Ken Segall =

American author (born 1950)

- Born: Detroit, Michigan; March 25, 1950 (age 76)
- Occupations: Author; speaker; creative director
- Known for: Apple advertising and "i" naming strategy; keynote speaker; simplicity advocate
- Website: kensegall.com

Ken Segall is an author and advertising creative director. Specializing in technology marketing, Segall was Steve Jobs' agency creative director for 12 years spanning NeXT and Apple, and also served as worldwide creative director at agencies for Dell, Intel and IBM.

== Early life ==
Kenneth Michael Segall was born in Detroit, Michigan, in 1950, the youngest of three children. His father's position with a retail chain forced the family to move several times before he was 10, taking him to Salina, Kansas, Ashtabula, Ohio, Detroit once again, and finally to Livingston, New Jersey. He graduated from Livingston High School in 1968 and earned a Bachelor of Science degree at Pennsylvania State University in 1972.

== Advertising ==
Segall joined ad agency Chiat/Day Los Angeles in 1979 as a file clerk. A creative career in the industry followed, from a first copywriting job on Smirnoff Vodka to creative director roles on global brands including Apple, IBM, BMW, Intel and Dell.

A 12-year working relationship with Steve Jobs began in 1988 when Segall joined NY agency Ammirati & Puris as creative director for Jobs’ new company, NeXT. When the agency resigned NeXT, Segall left to continue working with Jobs independently. In 1997, Jobs brought Apple back to its original agency (then called TBWA Chiat/Day). There, Segall was global creative director for the "Think different" campaign, co-writer of the "Crazy Ones" launch commercial, and originated the "i" strategy behind the naming of iMac, iPod, iPhone and iPad.

In later years, Segall served as creative director for Intel at agency Euro RSCG, and chief creative officer at Enfatico (previously DaVinci), a worldwide network of 13 offices handling marketing for computer-maker Dell.

== Author and speaker ==
Segall has written two books on the power of simplicity, both published by Penguin—"Insanely Simple: The Obsession That Drives Apple's Success" (2012) and "Think Simple: How Smart Leaders Defeat Complexity" (2016).
