= Lee Olesky =

American co-founder of TradeWeb (born 1961)

Lee H. Olesky
- Born: 1961 (age 64–65)
- Education: Livingston High School; Tulane University (BA, 1984); George Washington University (JD, 1987)
- Known for: Co-founder of Tradeweb
- Children: 3

Lee H. Olesky (born 1961) is an American businessman who was the co-founder and former chairman and chief executive of Tradeweb.

He has been featured several times by Institutional Investor in its annual rankings of the industry's top financial technology innovators.

== Biography ==
=== Early life and education ===
Olesky is a native of New Jersey. His father was the president of a pipe manufacturing company in Garwood, New Jersey. He has one sister, Dara (Olesky) Rudorfer.

Olesky attended Livingston High School, where he was a member of the tennis team, although he did not get much play. In 1984, Olesky earned a B.A. in history from Tulane University. Without career plans, he then attended George Washington University Law School, from where he earned a J.D. in 1987.

=== Career ===
After graduation, Olesky was a mergers and acquisitions lawyer for two years.

In 1989, Olesky joined Credit Suisse First Boston, then known as First Boston, where he worked on derivatives. From 1993 to 1999 he worked in a variety of management positions, ultimately as Chief Operating Officer for the Fixed Income Americas division. While at Credit Suisse, Olesky co-wrote the business plan for Tradeweb, assembled a consortium of investors, and helped launch Tradeweb as a multi-bank joint venture in 1998, creating the first multi-dealer online marketplace for U.S. Treasury Securities. He served as the first chairman of Tradeweb's board of directors.

In 1999, Olesky left Credit Suisse and relocated to London to co-found BrokerTec Global. He served as the CEO until BrokerTec was acquired in 2002 by ICAP plc.

Following the acquisition of BrokerTec Global, Olesky rejoined Tradeweb as President in 2002. He remained in London, where he focused on building out Tradeweb's presence in Europe, as well as the company's expansion into derivatives and Asia, the sale of Tradeweb to Thomson Reuters in 2004, and the acquisition of LeverTrade in 2006.

In 2008, Olesky returned to New York and was appointed CEO of Tradeweb. That year, he led the acquisition of Hilliard Farber.

In 2011, he led the acquisition of the brokerage division of Rafferty Capital Markets

In 2013, Olesky led the acquisition of BondDesk.

In April 2019, following two decades of private ownership, Olesky led the initial public offering of Tradeweb on the New York Stock Exchange, in one of the most successful IPOs of the year.

In February 2022, Olesky was appointed chairman of the board of Tradeweb and announced he would retire as CEO at the end of 2022. He retired as chairman in June 2023.

=== Other positions ===
Olesky serves on the board of trustees of Mount Sinai Health System

He is a member of the board of Credit Benchmark.

From 2012 to 2016, he was a member of the Leadership Council of Habitat for Humanity – New York City. He was previously a member of a member of the United States Securities and Exchange Commission's Fixed Income Market Structure Advisory Committee (FIMSAC) and the Commodity Futures Trading Commission Technology Advisory Committee (TAC). He was a member of the International Advisory Board of BritishAmerican Business.

== Personal life ==
In 1993, Olesky married Amy Rosenkrantz. They have 3 sons.
