= Robert Wood Johnson Foundation =

American philanthropic organization

- Abbreviation: RWJF
- Founded: 1936
- Founder: Robert Wood Johnson II
- Purpose: Improving the health and well-being of all in America
- Location: Princeton, New Jersey, U.S.
- Region served: National
- Method: Grantmaking and social change
- CEO: Richard Besser
- Disbursements: ~$500 million annually
- Endowment: $13 billion (2020)
- Employees: 270
- Website: www.rwjf.org

The Robert Wood Johnson Foundation (RWJF) is an American philanthropic organization. It is the largest U.S. philanthropic foundation focused solely on health. Based in Princeton, New Jersey, the foundation focuses on access to health care, public health, health equity, leadership and training, and changing systems to address barriers to health. RWJF has been credited with helping to develop the 911 emergency system, reducing tobacco use among Americans, lowering rates of unwanted teenage pregnancies, and improving perceptions of hospice care.

The Robert Wood Johnson Foundation supports the development of programs that can be used in community-led initiatives or by government bodies, funds research through surveys and polls, and makes impact investments. According to Pensions & Investments and Foundation Center, the foundation was the fifth-largest in the U.S. in investment assets, as of 2015. As of 2020, the value of its endowment was $13 billion.

== History ==
The Robert Wood Johnson Foundation was initially established as the Johnson-New Brunswick Foundation in December 1936, and focused on charitable efforts in New Brunswick, New Jersey. The original board of trustees included Robert Wood Johnson II, John Seward Johnson II, and others. It was renamed the Robert Wood Johnson Foundation in 1952. Robert Wood Johnson II left a bequest of 10,204,377 shares of Johnson & Johnson stock to the foundation upon his death in 1968. The foundation became a national philanthropy in 1972. The value of the stock was more than US$1 billion, making it the second-largest private foundation at the time.

=== 1972–1985 ===
Initially, the foundation worked on improving access to health care, with a focus on impoverished and minority groups, infant and elder care, and mental health. It created a $15 million grant program to contribute to the development of emergency services systems in the United States. Then-president David E. Rogers established a partnership with the National Academy of Sciences to increase oversight of how the funds were used and assess project outcomes. Ultimately, the funds were distributed to 44 grantees in amounts ranging from $350,000 to $400,000. The program funded primary aspects of emergency medical services, including: technology access, such as equipping ambulances with radios; training for ambulance drivers and dispatchers; interagency coordination through a national centralized, regional-based system; and development of the 911 emergency system. In 1973, 11 percent of areas covered by the foundation's program had access to a centralized emergency services system. By 1977, when the program ended, coverage had increased to 95 percent.

In 1985, the foundation partnered with The Pew Charitable Trusts to launch a new program to improve access to health care for the American homeless population. The organizations committed $25 million over five years to 19 pilot programs as part of their Health Care for the Homeless initiative. Approaches to the issue varied by city. For example, a Philadelphia program connected hospitals with homeless shelters, so individuals experiencing homelessness had access to inpatient and outpatient care. Another program in New York City focused on providing care in soup kitchens. Congress followed the foundation's program for providing health care through shelters by passing the McKinney–Vento Homeless Assistance Act.

Other early foundation efforts included: support for the Nurse-Family Partnership, which partners at-risk pregnant women with nurses; establishing the Minority Medical Faculty Development Program (renamed the Harold Amos Medical Faculty Development Program in 2004); and supporting development of the "swing bed" concept in rural hospitals, which allows patients to transition from acute care to skilled-nursing without having to transfer to a nursing home.

=== 1986–2001 ===
Beginning in 1986, the foundation focused on funding programs for the treatment HIV/AIDS, despite the stigma surrounding the disease. It launched the AIDS Health Services Program in 11 communities around the U.S., which aimed to integrate a network of human services agencies for case management and favored community-care models for patients. By May 1989, the foundation had given $50 million to care services and prevention campaigns. The Ryan White CARE Act was partially modeled on RWJF's program.

After Steven A. Schroeder became the foundation's president in 1990, he made substance abuse a major focus of the foundation's work. Between 1991 and 2003, the foundation spent approximately $408 million on a variety of tobacco-related programs, including awareness campaigns on smoking cessation and the negative effects of tobacco use. The foundation launched Smokeless States in 1993, a program designed to educate local groups about the effects of tobacco and options for regulating tobacco usage. By 2007, 31 states and the District of Columbia had adopted the program. The foundation's Center for Tobacco-Free Kids was asked to participate as a "disinterested and trustworthy party" in state litigation leading up to the Tobacco Master Settlement Agreement of 1998.

Apart from substance abuse, the foundation also funded studies on palliative care and worked with researchers to develop the chronic care model. In 1989, the organization funded a five-year, $28 million study on palliative care, publishing the results in 1995. The Study to Understand Prognoses and Preferences for Outcomes and Risks of Treatment found that most Americans die alone in hospitals while receiving high-cost care and treatment, often against the patient's desires. The study led to the formation of several groups by the foundation, including Last Acts, 900 entities that have drafted best practices for palliative care. Between 1989 and 2007, the foundation gave more than $148 million for research related to palliative care. By 2007, more than 500 hospitals throughout the U.S. had palliative care programs, most of which were created after the foundation and George Soros's Open Society Institute began research and advocacy efforts.

During this period, the foundation also contributed to efforts to enroll more uninsured U.S. children in medicare. A study published in Health Affairs noted that RWJF spent $55 million on its Covering Kids campaign, which lasted from 1997 until 2002. The study found that the overall rate of uninsured children in the U.S. decreased during the campaign.

=== 2002–2017 ===
In the early 2000s, under the leadership of Risa Lavizzo-Mourey, the foundation prioritized childhood obesity, and pledged of $1 billion for research and advocacy to raise awareness on the topic. Grants from this pledge, the first $500 million of which came in 2007, have been used to fund projects in cities throughout the United States. As early as 2003, the foundation was working in Louisville, Kentucky, providing more than $740,000 in grants between 2003 and 2011 to make infrastructure updates that encourage physical activity, such as widening sidewalks and adding the city's first bicycle lane.

The foundation also continued to work on eldercare topics and provided funding for the Green House Project, a non-profit that offers a long-term care alternative to nursing homes. While nursing homes tended to be regimented, the Green House model allows residents to set their own schedules, and houses fewer people in more units designed like a single family home. In 2011, the foundation established a $100 million impact capital fund to develop the Green House model. By 2014, 27 states had adopted versions of the Green House Project. A 2017 study on Green House nursing homes funded by the foundation found that while imperfect, the model had better outcomes for residents, including fewer hospitalizations and a lower occurrence of conditions such as pressure ulcers.

In 2003, the foundation worked with the College Board to create the Young Epidemiology Scholars (YES) program to encourage high-school students to study in the area of public health; the program ran for 8 years.

The foundation established the commission to Build a Healthier America in 2008. The non-partisan group included individuals from business, academia, and politics and focused on studying ways to improve health in the U.S. outside of the health care system. The commission compiled five years' worth of research into a report it released in 2014. The report focused on social determinants of health and detailed three strategies to improve health in the U.S.: early-childhood education; community-based health initiatives; and preventative care.

In 2010, the Robert Wood Johnson Foundation partnered with the University of Wisconsin's Population Health Institute to launch the County Health Ranking program, which calculates and compares the health of each county, nationwide. The counties are measured and ranked on various health and social factors, which include more than 30 indicators such as obesity, tobacco use, mental health, employment and poverty rates, and access to healthy food. Over time, the foundation added coaches and competitions to the program to support communities' efforts to improve local health. This was done in response to growing evidence showing that social factors and individuals' actions could affect a population's health more than the quality of medical treatment. The foundation also partnered with Federal Reserve Banks to engage impact investors, banks, and community developers in health and wellness-based projects through the Healthy Communities Initiative.

In 2014, the foundation announced a major shift in its approach to health issues. It had previously focused on specific health issues, and would instead focus on changes that could lead to large-scale social shifts by building what it called a "culture of health". The change built on the Culture of Health Action Framework adopted by the foundation in 2013. Critics of the shift expressed concern that funding for some areas—such as leadership training for doctors, and programs for nursing and health policy—was being discontinued as part of the shift. When describing the changes at the Aspen Ideas Festival, Lavizzo-Mourey said, "We have to make a seismic shift in the way we deal with health, and it has to come from the ground up."

A 2017 survey conducted by RWJF, NPR, and Harvard T.H. Chan School of Public Health found that people in America report that their personal experience with discrimination regularly affects their lives and drives decisions that influence their health, safety, and well-being. Experiences with discrimination correlated to an increased risk for health conditions such as coronary heart disease. In 2018, the foundation co-funded a study along with the National Institutes of Health that found police killings of unarmed black Americans led to adverse mental health affects among black American respondents. Other public opinion polls RWJF worked on with NPR and Harvard University have covered issues such as the burden of stress in America (2014), education and health in schools (2013), trust in public health (2021), income inequality (2020), and experiences during the pandemic (2021).

=== 2018–present ===
Under Richard Besser's leadership, the foundation prioritized health equity and removing barriers to health resulting from discrimination. In an address given at the Sanford School of Public Policy at Duke University, Besser pointed to where people live, recreate, and work as well as access to healthy food and livable wages, and removal of cultural barriers as important factors in individual health. The foundation funded a 2021 analysis by the Urban Institute which found that black patients experience "dangerous bleeding, infections and other serious problems related to surgical procedures" more frequently than white patients who receive care in the same hospital.

In 2019, the foundation worked with the Global Reporting Initiative and others to develop the Culture of Health for Business Framework. The framework provides 16 best practices for companies to measure health policies and practices against, ranging from environmental to social and governance issues.

During the COVID-19 pandemic, the foundation partnered with organizations such as NPR to research financial, educational, and health impacts of the pandemic. The foundation also has ongoing surveys with the Rand Corporation, one of which found that many Americans agree that minority communities have been more affected by the pandemic, but do not believe structural racism is a barrier to health.

The foundation's other activities in response to the COVID-19 pandemic included collaborating with Boston University to develop a database of state policies enacted in response to the pandemic, and hosting teleconferences and virtual discussions on how the pandemic unveiled the impact that systemic racism and other forms of discrimination have on health in America.

During this period, RWJF partnered with the Ford Foundation to establish the Presidents' Council on Disability Inclusion in Philanthropy. The group includes 17 grant making organizations. The council's focus is on improving inclusion of disability issues in philanthropy. The foundation also funded the Childhood Opportunity Index, which ranks neighborhoods across the U.S. on access to childhood development resources that can affect health and life expectancy, and income later in life. The index was initially published in 2014, and an updated version was released in January 2020.

== Leadership ==
The foundation's first president, David E. Rogers, served from 1972 until 1987. Leighton E. Cluff served as the foundation's president from 1986 until February 1990, when he was succeeded by Steven A. Schroeder. The foundation's board of trustees selected Schroeder to lead the foundation, knowing he wanted to take it "in the direction of working on substance abuse problems".

Risa Lavizzo-Mourey was the first woman and African American to be the foundation's chief executive officer, a role she held between 2002 and 2017. She was succeeded by Richard E. Besser, who was named president and CEO in April 2017. Besser previously worked as the medical editor for ABC News and acting director of the Centers for Disease Control.
