= Tradeweb =

American financial services company

Tradeweb Markets Inc.
- Type: Public
- Traded as: Nasdaq: TW (Class A); Russell 1000 component
- Industry: Technology; Financial markets
- Founded: 1998; 28 years ago
- Headquarters: 245 Park Avenue, New York City, U.S.
- Key people: Jacques Aigrain, Chair; Billy Hult, CEO; Sara Furber, CFO
- Products: Electronic trading platforms to trade bonds, derivatives, and equities
- Revenue: ▲US$2.1 billion (2025)
- Operating income: ▲US$835.3 million (2025)
- Net income: ▲US$921.5 million (2025)
- Total assets: ▲US$8.19 billion (2025)
- Total equity: ▲US$7.19 billion (2025)
- Number of employees: 1,569 (2025)
- Website: tradeweb.com

Tradeweb Markets Inc., headquartered in New York City, operates electronic trading platforms primarily used by institutional investors to trade fixed income products, ETFs, and derivatives. It has over 3,000 customers including banks, asset managers, central banks, pension funds, and insurance companies. In 2024, 83% of the company's revenue was from transaction fees and commissions and 17% was from subscription fees. In 2024, 52% of revenue came from products related to rates, 27% of revenues came from products related to credit, 7% came from products related to money markets and repurchase agreements, 7% of revenues came from market data, and 6% of revenues came from equities transactions. The company's primary competitors are MarketAxess, Bloomberg L.P., Intercontinental Exchange, CME Group, BGC Group, Euronext, and Trumid.

The company is a major facilitator of trades of government bonds, mortgages, interest rate swaps, and ETFs. The company's goal is to make trading fixed income products as easy as trading stocks by "electronifying, and modernizing the bond market".

The company is majority-owned and controlled by the London Stock Exchange Group.

== History ==
The company was co-founded in 1996 by Lee Olesky and Jim Toffey, who came up with the idea while working at Credit Suisse First Boston. The trading platform was launched in 1998 as the first multi-dealer online trading network for U.S. Treasuries. In 2000, the firm opened its London office and launched marketplaces for trading European government bonds and agency debt.

In 2004, the company was acquired by Thomson Corporation (now Thomson-Reuters) for $535 million. Tradeweb established its Tokyo office in 2005, starting a partnership with CanDeal to launch Canadian debt securities trading. That year, the firm grew by introducing marketplaces for interest rate swaps, credit default swap indices, and repurchase agreements.

In 2005, Tradeweb launched TradeWeb IRS, a US dollar-denominated interest rate swap platform, with the support of seven major dealers.

In 2006, Tradeweb acquired Lever-Trade, which was rebranded Tradeweb Retail, a provider of web-based fixed income management systems for the retail marketplace.

In 2007, Thomson Financial, a unit of Thomson Reuters, announced its plans to expand electronic trading by creating a strategic partnership with nine other global dealers through Tradeweb. The dealers also invested $180 million in Tradeweb at a valuation of $1.55 billion.

In September 2008, Olesky became CEO. and Billy Hult became president.

In November 2008, Tradeweb acquired brokerage firm Hilliard Farber & Co. Inc.

In 2009, it launched Dealerweb, an electronic interdealer platform for to-be-announced, or forward, mortgage-backed securities (TBA-MBS).

In 2010, it facilitated the first fully electronic, dealer-to-customer interest rate swap to be processed by a central clearing house in the U.S.

In 2011, it acquired the brokerage assets of Rafferty Capital Markets LLC (RaffCap) and the municipal bond broking business of J.J. Kenny Drake.

In September 2013, the firm received approval from the Commodity Futures Trading Commission for two wholly owned swap execution facilities (SEFs) TW SEF and DW SEF. Live SEF trading on the platforms began on October 2, 2013.

In November 2013, the firm acquired BondDesk Group, a bond trading venue in the U.S. for advisors and middle market investors, and integrated the businesses, technology, services and support of its existing Tradeweb Retail trading platform with BondDesk, and rebranded the combined service Tradeweb Direct.

In May 2014, Tradeweb and BlackRock announced a strategic partnership in electronic trading in rates and derivatives markets for BlackRock's Aladdin clients. In June 2014, Tradeweb launched active U.S. Treasury bond trading on the Dealerweb platform, supporting trading of the most liquid on-the-run Treasury bonds with participation from dealers and several electronic market-making firms.

In October 2014, the company announced the launch of its U.S. institutional corporate bond platform.

In February 2016, Tradeweb launched an OTC marketplace for U.S.-listed ETFs aimed at institutional investors. In March 2016, the company acquired CodeStreet LLC.

In October 2016, Tradeweb, along with FTSE Russell, was named a provider of Gilt and Treasury Bill end-of-day reference pricing by the U.K. Treasury.

The same month, the firm became one of four electronic trading platforms to launch the Electronic Debt Markets Association Europe (EDMA Europe), which was formed to develop and promote collective member views on regulatory developments affecting electronic fixed income trading venues in Europe.

In January 2017, the firm announced the launch of an Approved Publication Arrangement (APA) service to allow market participants to meet post-trade requirements mandated by the Markets in Financial Instruments Directive (MiFID) II.

In March 2017, Citadel Securities became a liquidity provider on the Tradeweb institutional U.S. Treasury marketplace, expanding its role on the platform beyond IRS, CDS indices, and U.S. ETFs. The firm announced the launch of all-to-all trading on its U.S. institutional credit platform in April, enabling clients to trade with more than 130 dealers.

In June 2017, Tradeweb became the first offshore trading platform to connect with the China Foreign Exchange Trade System (CFETS), allowing investors outside of China to invest in the China Interbank Bond Market for the first time.

In 2017, the firm also made a strategic investment in DealVector, Inc., a fixed income asset registry and communication platform.

In May 2018, Tradeweb partnered with Plato to launch eBlock, a European cash equities block trading platform.

In August 2018, it launched an RfQ platform for US equity options allowing traders to send multiple price requests to multiple liquidity providers.

In April 2019, the company became a public company via an initial public offering, raising $1.1 billion in the best-performing IPO exceeding $1 billion for 2019.

Also in April 2019, the Federal Housing Finance Agency announced it was partnering with Tradeweb to begin trading a single security for mortgages backed by Fannie Mae and Freddie Mac.

In September 2019, Tradeweb and Intercontinental Exchange launched Tradeweb ICE U.S. Treasury Closing Prices, which calculates and publishes more than 900 Treasury securities prices daily, and in October the firm expanded portfolio trading for corporate bonds.

In June 2021, Tradeweb acquired the U.S. fixed income electronic trading platform of Nasdaq, Inc., formerly known as eSpeed, for $190 million in cash. It was integrated into Dealerweb in 2023.

In June 2022, Tradeweb announced a partnership with FXall, the foreign exchange aggregator run by the London Stock Exchange Group, which majority owns Tradeweb, to link trading workflows in emerging markets currency swaps and emerging markets bonds.

In January 2023, Billy Hult succeeded Lee Olesky as CEO of Tradeweb and Thomas Pluta became the company's President. Pluta left the company in 2024.

In August 2023, Tradeweb acquired Yieldbroker, an Australian trading platform, for A$123.6 million.

In January 2024, Tradeweb acquired r8fin, a technology provider that specializes in algorithmic-based execution for U.S. Treasuries and interest rate futures, for $125.9 million in cash and stock.

In August 2024, Tradeweb acquired Institutional Cash Distributors, an investment technology provider for corporate treasury organizations trading short-term investments, for $785 million in cash.

In April 2025, Tradeweb introduced electronic portfolio trading for European government bonds, including UK gilt-edged securities, euro, and single currency notes.

In June 2025, Tradeweb launched trading in U.S. Treasury bills for corporate treasurers via direct connection between its ICD Portal and its institutional trading platform.

In August 2025, Tradeweb executed the first electronic bilateral multi-asset package list trade, including uncleared swaps and cash bonds in a single package.
