= American School Board Journal =

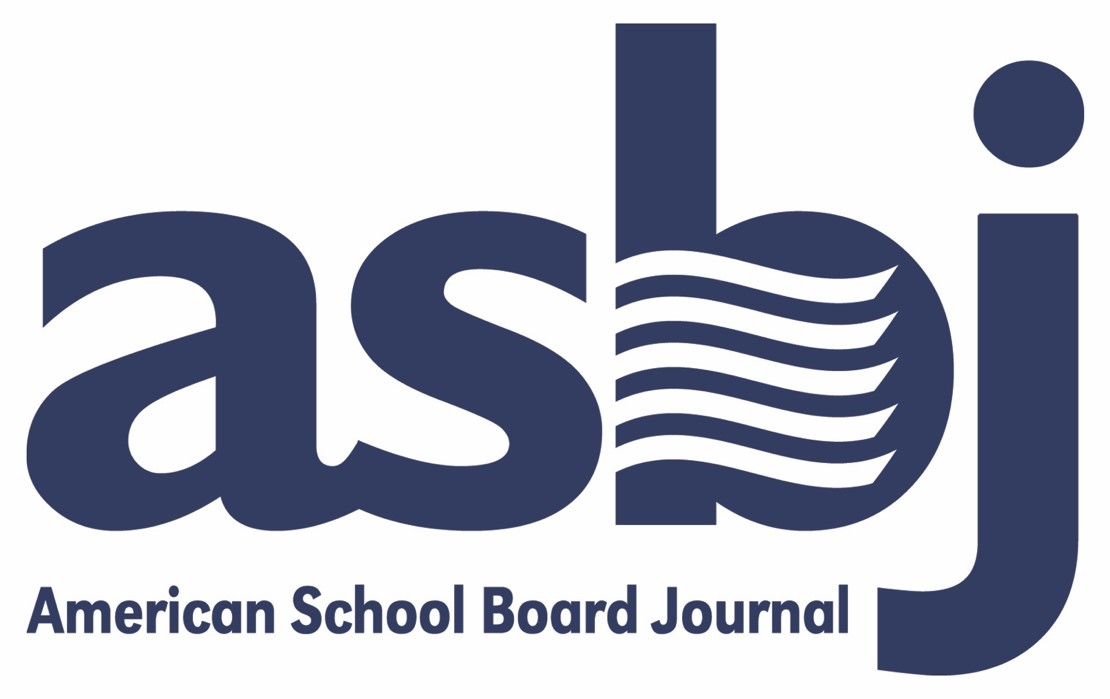
- Categories: Education
- Frequency: Quarterly
- Publisher: National School Boards Association
- Total circulation: 23,569
- Founded: 1891; 134 years ago
- Country: United States
- Based in: Alexandria, Virginia
- Language: English
- Website: nsba.org/ASBJ
- ISSN: 0003-0953

The American School Board Journal is a monthly trade magazine on school administration established in 1891 by the United States National School Boards Association.

== Scope ==
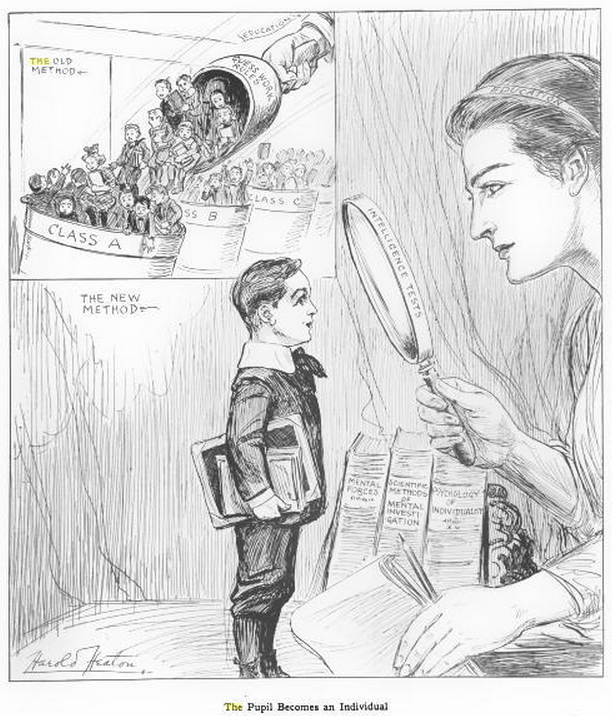
Illustration of how placement of school pupils into classes changed after widespread use of IQ tests, from cover of April 1922, American School Board Journal.

The focus of the American School Board Journal is on the challenges of K-12 public schools and topics related to school leadership, governance, management, policy making, and student achievement.

== Magna Awards ==
The American School Board Journal organizes the "Magna Awards" which is an annual program to showcase school districts and projects in the United States which are examples of innovation and excellence in school governance. The program was started in 1995 by the magazine with an objective to highlight school boards that improve educational programs by taking remarkable steps. Currently, the Magna Awards program is co-sponsored by the National School Boards Association and Sodexo.

Nominees are separated into three categories based on the size of their school districts: enrollment under 5,000, from 5,000 to 20,000, and over 20,000. In each category, there is one grand prize winner, five additional awards and five honorable mentions. The criteria of judging include the involvement of the school board, the success of the projects, the ability to replicate in other school districts, and the advancement of student learning.

== Awards and recognition ==
The American School Board Journal received the following awards:

- Two articles from the magazine were finalists of the National Magazine Awards in 1980 and 1984 in the categories of "Specialized Journalism" and "Public Service" respectively.
- The 2001 "Golden Lamp Award" in adult publication from the Association of Educational Publishers.
- The Education Writers Association's National Awards for Education Reporting in multiple years.
