= International Child Art Foundation =

- Founded: 1997
- Founder: Dr. Ashfaq Ishaq Katty Guerami
- Type: Educational Charity
- Purpose: Environmentalism, Peace, Children, Creativity, Empathy
- Region served: International

The International Child Art Foundation is a nonprofit organization founded in 1997.

== History ==
Since 1999 the ICAF has produced the World Children's Festival every four years on The National Mall in Washington, D.C. to honor the Arts Olympiad winners at an event of children's co-learning and co-creation.

== Arts Olympiad ==
The ICAF's flagship program is the Arts Olympiad. This art and sport program is for children ages 8 to 1. The Arts Olympiad winners represent their cities at the World Children's Festival at the National Mall in Washington, DC.

== Healing Arts Programs ==
The Healing Arts Programs was started in response to the Asian tsunami of December 2004. The organization wanted to transfer the knowledge and experience gained from the treatment of the child survivors of the 9/11 attacks to help the tsunami child survivors. The Tsunami Healing Arts Program was extended to the U.S. Gulf Coast as Katrina Healing Arts Program after Hurricane Katrina.The ICAF partnered with the World Bank Arts Program in 2005 on its "Destruction, Reconstruction and Prevention" program to broaden the understanding of natural disasters in the international development community.

== Accomplishments ==
- Approximately 5 million children in 80 countries have produced art under the ICAF programs.
