= Organization of the artist =

The organization of the artist is a method used by architect Frank Gehry that places the artist in control of the design throughout a building construction and deliberately eliminates the influence of politicians and business people on design.

Gehry enforces this organizational set-up when his designs are being built to avoid subordination of the design creator and to manage the project effectively. The heart of the phrase "organization of the artist" is to ensure that the design of the artist is actually built and not some compromise decided by political and business interests.

== Origin ==
Gehry initially developed the concept of the organization of the artist as a reaction against what he calls the "marginalization of the artist."

Gehry argues that the organization of the artist, in addition to making possible artistic integrity, also helps keep his buildings on time and budget, which is rare for the type of innovative and complex designs that Gehry is known for. The organization of the artist thus serves the dual purpose of artistic freedom and economic prudence.

== Application ==
In other projects Gehry has been less successful in enforcing the organization of the artist. For the Walt Disney Concert Hall in Los Angeles (1989–2003) there was much interference from business and political interests, which caused large delays and cost overruns and an attempt to oust Gehry from the project. The integrity of Gehry's design was preserved only by the Disney family stepping in and demanding that Gehry stay on and finish the building.

The organization of the artist is particularly relevant to organizations that place innovation and innovators at the core of their business model. Apple Inc. and Pixar are such organizations and they are both organized according to versions of the organization of the artist. Former Apple CEO Steve Jobs explicitly celebrated the ideas of Frank Gehry in Apple's "Think different" campaign.
