= Operational loads monitoring =

Operational loads monitoring (OLM) is a term given to act of investigating the characteristics of a structure in its normal operating environment. This term is often used to describe programs involving aircraft to extending their in-service life in a manner that does not compromise flight safety. A typical program would involve the installation of strain gauges to measure loads, accelerometers to measure g-force and other parameters to support the program or to add value (such as flap position, aircraft altitude, environmental conditions etc.), data acquisition system to process this data and a recorder to save the data for later analysis . In this way it is very similar to structural health monitoring, a term that is sometimes also used to describe operational loads monitoring. Unlike Health and Usage Monitoring Systems, OLM programs are generally a short term project used to assess the remaining useful safe life of an airframe. This is especially important when an aircraft's role changes as the stresses and strains may now be significantly different from those initially anticipated. OLM program's benefits include a possible increased safe operating life figure and helping to prevent accidents such as the C-130 crash that occurred after the platform had been modified and flown for a different mission (fire fighting). There are several active OLM programs currently underway, including research initiatives to standardize approaches for civilian aircraft.
