= Arts Olympiad =

International art competition for children

The Arts Olympiad is an international art competition for children aged 8 to 12, organized by the International Child Art Foundation. It features one million participants from seventy countries. Held every four years, each competition spans four years and incorporates elements of art and peace. The goal is to inspire children worldwide to use creativity and cooperation.

== History ==
Dr. Ashfaq Ishaq, founder of the International Child Art Foundation, started the first Arts Olympiad competition in 1999 to address the issue which was coined decades earlier as the "fourth grade slump" in creativity. The researchers at the time suggested that the phenomenon is a result of a drop in creativity around the ages of nine as they start conforming to standardized testing and to please parents and teachers. The plan was to let children who were the winners of U.S. states and other countries to come together in a festival to let them work together and learn other cultures with the goal to move future generations toward global peace.

The theme for the first Art Olympiad was My World in the Year 2000 to ask children to create art in which they envisioned themselves in the new millennium. There were one million children in 86 countries in the program which was run between 1997 and 2000. The winning pieces from around the world were exhibited at the World Children’s Festival in 1999 on the National Mall in Washington, DC. The artworks were also later exhibited at the White House Millennium Celebration, the United Nations Headquarters, and the 2003 World Bank/IMF Annual Meetings in Dubai.

Since then the format of the global competition, a festival in Washington, DC and global exhibitions have been following in the next Arts Olympiad cycles. The 2nd Arts Olympiad was held between 2001 and 2004 with the theme of Me in the New Millennium. Starting in the 3rd Arts Olympiad (2005–2008), the theme was shifted to relate art and sport to promote the artist-athlete ideal. The fourth Arts Olympiad (2009–2012) continued the same theme with title My Favorite Sport.

== Selection Process ==
During the first two years of the competition, local schools are participated in the Arts Olympiad lesson plan. The artworks as the result of the lessons are then put into a selection process.

The selection process in the United States is first done from at the local school district. The selection of artworks from within a school or school district. The artworks are then submitted to Washington, DC for another selection to have a representative of each participating state.

In other countries, the partner in each country will administrate the selection. The selection can be in many phases involving the competition at the local level and at the national level.

The winners who represent the participating U.S. states and countries are invited to the World Children's Festival in Washington, DC.

== World Children's Festival ==
The World Children's Festival is a three-day festival held every four years on the National Mall in Washington, DC for winners of the Arts Olympiad to participate. The festival includes over 50 performances and many art-related workshops. It also has sessions for the winners from different countries to co-create artworks with many adult artists.

Before the event, the Arts Olympiad winners from Washington, D.C. are asked to be ambassadors for the festival and exchange emails with international winners to welcome to the festival. The international winners are welcomed to the host families around the Washington area.

Children share ideas and work together during the three-day festival. On the last night of the festival, the celebratory dinner is held with all guests dressing in national attire.

Similar festivals have been replicated in other counties such as the European Children's Festival at Olympia Park in Munich in 2006.

== International exhibitions ==
After the World Children's Festival, the winning pieces will travel to exhibitions in the U.S. and internationally. The past exhibitions have been in United Arab Emirates, Germany, Israel, South Korea, Saudi Arabia, Japan, Uganda, Italy, Egypt, Switzerland, United Kingdom, and Qatar.

== Roles of Winners ==
The organizer have seen the potential and the importance of Art Olympiad winners to promote the cause. An example was demonstrated when a winner from Peru who have gone through difficulties in arranging competition because there was no office of the Internal Child Art Foundation in the country, that child eventually set up and organize the competition in the country for the next season with the support from the ministry of education. With that, they started encouraging the winners to contribute back to the program and set up a youth board for the organization.

=== Youth Board Members ===
In each cycle of the Arts Olympiad competition, a number of winners are choose to serve the youth board of the organization. Their roles are to be organization's spokespersons, conduct fundraising to support the programs, write for ChildArt magazine, help stage and be the master of ceremonies at the World Children's Festival, and nominate innovative leaders, companies and organizations for the World Children's Award.

Since the formation of the youth board there have been 38 members from two dozen counties.
