= United States National Chemistry Olympiad =

Contest held by the American Chemical Society

The United States National Chemistry Olympiad (or USNCO) is a contest held by the American Chemical Society (ACS) used to select the four-student team that represents the United States at the International Chemistry Olympiad (IChO).

Each local ACS section selects 10 students (or more for larger ACS sections) to take the USNCO National Exam. To qualify for the national exam, students must first take the local exam. Approximately 10,000 U.S. students sit for the local exam each year. More than 1000 students qualify to take the National Exam annually.

== Exam format ==
The National Exam consists of three parts.

=== Multiple choice ===
The first part contains 60 multiple-choice questions. Each question has four answer choices. The questions are loosely grouped into 10 sets of 6 items; each set corresponds to a different chemistry topic. Typically, the topics are, in order, descriptive chemistry/laboratory techniques, stoichiometry, gases/liquids/solids, thermodynamics, kinetics, equilibrium, electrochemistry, electronic structure/periodic trends, bonding theories, and organic chemistry. There is no penalty for guessing; a student's score is equal to the number of questions answered correctly. One and a half hours (90 minutes) are allotted for this first part.

=== Free response ===
The second part contains 8 free response questions. Complete written explanations and calculations are required for full credit on a question, and partial credit is awarded. More thorough knowledge of basic theories is required, and often there are questions on less-emphasized portions of normal high school chemistry curricula, such as organic chemistry and coordination chemistry. One hour and 45 minutes (105 minutes) are allowed for this section. The topics of each question in the recent part II’s of USNCO usually follows the following format:

Q1: Stoichiometry

Q2: Equilibrium

Q3. Assorted (typically either thermodynamics, electrochemistry, or kinetics)

Q4. Assorted (typically either thermodynamics, electrochemistry, or kinetics)

Q5. Prediction of chemical reaction products. Includes acid-base reactions as well as redox reactions. Part F is usually on radioisotope decay.

Q6. Assorted (could be any topic that is not anywhere else)

Q7. Bonding

Q8. Organic Chemistry

=== Lab practical ===
Beginning in 1994, the lab practical was added to the National Exam. It contains two tasks to be performed by each student with only the specified materials, and students are expected to describe their procedures and organize their findings. Past tasks have included chromatography, titration and qualitative analysis, and 90 minutes are allotted to complete the two experiments.

== USNCO Study Camp and other recognition ==
The top 20 scorers on the USNCO National Exam are invited to participate in the two-week USNCO Study Camp at the University of Maryland, College Park in College Park, Maryland. At the camp, the students are tested (both free response and lab testing), and the top four students are selected to comprise the U.S. IChO team. Two alternates are also selected, although no alternate has ever actually been called up for duty.

In addition, the top 50 students are recognized as achieving "High Honors" or "t50", and the next 100 students earn the "Honors" or "t150" designation. In some years, especially earlier ones, the top ~200 instead of top 150 are listed as "Honors".

== Scope of the test as compared to the IChO ==
The purpose of the USNCO is to stimulate all young people to achieve excellence in chemistry. Therefore, the focus of the exam is not necessarily to select the top twenty students, and instead to present a wide selection of basic questions. Therefore, the scope of the USNCO is different than the scope of what would be expected at the training camp or IChO.

== See also ==
- International Chemistry Olympiad
- Other International Science Olympiads
