= USA Biolympiad =

The USA Biolympiad (USABO), formerly called the USA Biology Olympiad before January 1, 2020, is a national competition sponsored by the Center for Excellence in Education to select the competitors for the International Biology Olympiad. Each year, twenty National Finalists gather at a nationally recognized institution for a two-week training camp. From the program's inception through 2009, the camp was held at George Mason University; from 2010 through 2015, the camp was held at Purdue University. It was then hosted at Marymount University for 2016 and 2017. The University of California, San Diego then hosted the competition for 2018 and 2019, after which Marymount University once again hosted it in for 2020, and from 2022 through 2024. Starting in 2025, Harvard University began hosting the camp. The camp was hosted virtually in 2021 due to the pandemic. At the end of the two weeks, four students are selected to represent the United States at the International Biology Olympiad.

== History ==
The USA Biolympiad was first started in 2002, with nearly 10,000 students competing annually. Ever since the CEE (Center for Excellence in Education) started to administer the USABO exam, all four members of the Team USA in the years 2004, 2007-2009, 2011-2013, 2015, and 2017 were awarded gold medals in the International Biology Olympiad, with the US National Team able to accrue the most medals and subsequently win the IBO in 2011, 2013, 2015, and 2017, partly due to the rigorous selection process students undergo to compete in the IBO for the US. The USABO exam was held online in 2020 and 2021 due to the COVID-19 pandemic.

== Organization and examination structure ==
USABO finalists are selected in two rounds of tests. The open exam is a 50-minute multiple-choice exam open to all high school students, who register through their school or an authorized USABO center. This exam is normally administered during the first week of February, though the exact test time may vary from year to year. During this round, there is no penalty for wrong answers, but students may only select one of the four or five choices for each question.

The top 10% of all participating students advance to the semi-final round, which is usually administered in March. This second exam consists of a 120-minute long test, subdivided into two multiple-choice sections and one free response section. Part A of the exam is primarily multiple choice questions with one answer. Part B has more complex, sequenced multiple select questions that may have several correct answers and may require calculations or extensive interpretation of graphs and multiple true/false choice questions, while Part C normally takes the form of short answers or an extended essay.

The final round of the USABO takes place as a national finals round, attended by the 20 top-scoring students on the Semifinal Exam. Students may take a 24-hour leave to return home for graduation purposes, as the CEE recognizes that the dates of the National Finals may conflict with high school graduation.

During the first ten days of instruction, university professors and experts in research and undergraduate/graduate teaching will be assisted by former USABO Finalists in teaching laboratory techniques and conceptual understanding to the finalists. After the ten days of instruction, a 9-hour long exam occurs, with students required to take the exams on the scheduled dates. This exam is divided into two sections: a 6 hour long practical exam and a 3-hour theoretical exam containing true/false questions and multiple choice questions. The scores from the two exams are combined to form a comprehensive ranking, with the 9th-12th placed finalists receiving a bronze medal, the 5th-8th placed finalists receiving a Silver medal, and the 1st-4th placed medalists receiving a Gold medal, and the chance to compete on the US national team in the IBO.

== Participant numbers ==
USABO Participants over the Years
Year of Competition	Participant Numbers	Percentage Growth
2011	1700 students	N/A
2012	2850 students	67.64%
2013	4200 students	47.43%
2014	5056 students	20.38%
2015	6000 students	18.67%
2016	7020 students	17.00%
2017	7500 students	6.83%
2023	9700 students	~
