= Young Epidemiology Scholars =

Public health scholarship program

- YES
- Awarded for: Public Health Research
- Location: Washington, D.C.
- Country: United States
- Presented by: The College Board
- First award: 2004
- Website: http://www.collegeboard.com/yes/index.html

Young Epidemiology Scholars (YES) was a United States scholarship program in the area of public health which was created in 2003 and closed in May 2011. It was sponsored by the Robert Wood Johnson Foundation and administered by the College Board.

== Goals ==
The program's goal was to inspire high-school students to do epidemiology research, and to inspire students to explore the broad field of public health. Such research could involve many different topics, including disease, social networking, methods of health education, sports injuries, obesity, stress, and sleeping patterns.

== Awards ==
The program offered up to 120 scholarships each year, for a total award amount of $456,000. All entrants submitted their paper to the program no later than the beginning of February. Of all submissions:

- 60 Semifinalists were chosen and given a $1000 scholarship.
- 60 Finalists, 10 from each region of the country, were chosen to compete at a higher level. They received an expenses-paid trip to the entire national competition in Washington, D.C.

=== In Washington ===
At the regional finals level, the 60 finalists were judged by a presentation to a group of judges, as well as a question and answer session. Of all the regional finalists,

- 48 (8 of each region) received a $2000 scholarship.
- 12 (2 of each region) were selected at National Finalists

The National Finalists then presented again to a national panel in the same format as before. Awards for the national finalists were as follows.

- 6 awards of $15,000.
- 2 awards of $20,000.
- 2 awards of $35,000.
- 2 awards of $50,000.

== First place winners ==
For a full list of winners, see the YES website.

=== (2010–2011) ===
- Michelle Lee of North Allegheny Senior High School in Wexford, PA for "Routine Outpatient Testing of Skin Infections for Methicillin-Resistant Staphylococcus Aureus (MRSA) in High School Athletes"
- Rebecca Leong of Columbia River High School in Vancouver, WA for "The Effect of Footwear Habits of Long-Distance Runners on Running-Related Injury: A Prospective Cohort"

=== 2009–2010 ===
- Shoshanna Goldin of Moravian Academy in Bethlehem, PA for "Energy Epidemic: Teen Perceptions and Consumption of Energy Drinks"
- Gazelle Zerafati of The Baldwin School in Bryn Mawr, PA for "Epidemiology of Migraine in Teenage Girls, A Student Population Based Study"

=== 2008–2009 ===
- Alexander Chernyakhovsky of William Mason High School in Mason, OH for "Global Epidemiological Analysis of Avian Influenza Viruses in Humans"
- Amrita Sehgal of Menlo-Atherton High School in Atherton, CA for "Can We Start the War on Osteoporosis Early? Are Teenagers Taking Enough Calcium?"

=== 2007–2008 ===
- Katie Everett of Huron High School in Ann Arbor, MI for "A Sexual-Network-Based Model Evaluating the Impact of Human Papillomavirus Vaccination on Infection Prevalence in an Adolescent Population"
- Jessica Palmer of Ossining High School in Ossining, NY for "Examining Repetitive Behaviors in Parents and Siblings of Individuals with Autism"

=== 2006–2007 ===
- Megan Blewett of Madison High School in Madison, NJ for "A Space/Time Epidemiological Comparison of Multiple Sclerosis and Amyotrophic Sclerosis"
- William Slack of Decatur High School in Decatur, GA for "Teen Drug, Alcohol, and Tobacco Use: A social network examination"

=== 2005–2006 ===
- Natalia Nazarewicz of Oak Ridge High School in Oak Ridge, TN for "Deliberate Self-Harm Among Adolescents: Prevalence, Risk Factors, and Treatment Options"
- Aman Prasad of Century High School in Pocatello, ID for "Physical Activity and Mood in Adolescents"

=== 2004–2005 ===
- Jessica Cohen of Roslyn High School in Roslyn Heights, NY for "The Impact of Condom Education on High School Students"
- Andreea Seicean of Bay High School in Bay Village, OH for "A Significant Association Between Short Sleeping Hours and Teens Overweight/Obesity: Results from Bay High School"

=== 2003–2004 ===
- Benjamin Eidelson of Akiba Hebrew Academy in Merion Station, PA for "VIR-POX: An Epidemiologic Study of Smallpox Preparedness and Response Policy"
- Robert Levine of Adlai E. Stevenson High School in Lincolnshire, IL for "Artificial Tanning by Suburban Teenagers: A Survey on the Prevalence of and Motivations for Indoor Tanning in the Midwest"
