= Accent =

Accent may refer to:

== Speech and language ==
- Accent (sociolinguistics), way of pronunciation particular to a speaker or group of speakers
- Accent (phonetics), prominence given to a particular syllable in a word, or a word in a phrase
  - Pitch accent, prominence signaled primarily by pitch
- Accent (poetry), placement of prominent syllables in scansion
- Diacritic, a mark added above, on top of, or below a letter
- Fallacy of accent, a logical fallacy related to reification

== Music ==
- Accent (music), an emphasis placed on a note
- The Accents, American doo-wop group
- Ecclesiastical accent, the simplest style of plainchant

== Computers ==
- Accent (programming language), an interpreted programming language
- Accent kernel, an operating system kernel

== Other uses ==
- Aeros Accent, a paraglider
- Hyundai Accent, car produced by Hyundai Motor Company
- Accent lighting, light focused on a particular area or object
- Accent Records, a record label
- ACCENT Speakers Bureau, a student-run organization at the University of Florida
- Ac'cent, brand name for monosodium glutamate (MSG)

== See also ==
- Accenture, company
- Accentor, a bird species
- Accentor-class minesweeper, ship
- Ascent (disambiguation)
