= A/UX =

Computer operating system

- A/UX 3.0.1 with Finder, CommandShell, and Netscape
- Developer: Apple Computer
- OS family: Macintosh; UNIX System V
- Working state: Historic
- Source model: Closed source
- Initial release: February 1988; 38 years ago
- Latest release: 3.1.1 / 1995; 31 years ago
- Kernel type: Monolithic kernel
- License: Proprietary

A/UX is a Unix-based operating system from Apple Computer for Macintosh computers, integrated with System 7's graphical interface and application compatibility. It is Apple's first official Unix-based operating system, launched in 1988 and discontinued in 1995 with version 3.1.1. A/UX requires select 68k-based Macintosh models with an FPU and a paged memory management unit (PMMU).

Its foundation is UNIX System V Release 2.2, with features from Releases 3 and 4 and from BSD versions 4.2 and 4.3. It is compliant with POSIX and System V Interface Definition (SVID), and includes TCP/IP networking since version 2. Having a Unix-compatible, POSIX-compliant operating system enabled Apple to bid for large contracts to supply computers to the U.S. federal government.

A/UX was described by MacUser as "the most interesting and impressive software to have come out of Apple since HyperCard" and by InfoWorld as "an open systems solution with the Macintosh at its heart".

== Features ==
A/UX has a graphical user interface (GUI) including the familiar Finder windows, menus, and controls. The A/UX Finder is a customized version of the System 7 Finder, adapted to run as a Unix process and to interact with the underlying Unix file systems. CommandShell is a GUI for the underlying Unix command-line interface. An X Window System server (called MacX) with a terminal program can interface with the system and run X applications alongside Finder. Alternatively, a full-screen X11R4 session can run without Finder.

Apple's compatibility layer allows A/UX to run applications for Macintosh System 7.0.1, Unix, and hybrids of both. For example, a Macintosh application can call Unix system functions, or a Unix application can call Macintosh Toolbox functions (such as QuickDraw), or a HyperCard stack can be a graphical frontend for a command-line Unix application. A/UX's compatibility layer uses some existing Toolbox functions in the computer's ROM, and other function calls are translated into native Unix system calls; and it cooperatively multitasks all Macintosh apps in a single address space by using a token-passing system for their access to the Toolbox.

The Commando utility assists users with entering Unix commands, resembling the one in Macintosh Programmer's Workshop. Opening a Unix executable file from Finder opens a dialog box that allows the user to choose command-line options for the program using standard controls such as radio buttons and check boxes, and display the resulting command line argument for the user before executing the command or program. This feature is intended to ease the learning curve for users new to Unix, and decrease the user's reliance on the Unix manual. A/UX has a utility that allows the user to reformat third-party SCSI drives in such a way that they can be used in other Macs of that era.

A/UX requires select models of 68k-based Macintoshes with a floating-point unit (FPU) and a paged memory management unit (PMMU).

== History ==
A/UX 1.0 was announced at the February 1988 Uniforum conference, seven months behind schedule. It is based on AT&T's UNIX System V.2.2 with additional features from BSD Unix, including networking support for TCP/IP, AppleTalk, and NFS implementations, and was developed for Apple by UniSoft. The base system has no GUI, with only the command line. It can run one Macintosh application at a time, using the System 6 GUI interface, although it is compatible with only about 10% of the existing Macintosh software library.

It was initially aimed at existing Unix customers, universities and VARs. The system was initially sold pre-installed on the Macintosh II for US$8,597 (equivalent to $23,400 in 2025), a larger monitor could be added, or a kit could upgrade an existing Mac II for a lower price. Third-party software announced with the system's first release includes the Ingres database, StatView, developer tools, and various productivity software packages.

A/UX 1.1 was released in 1989, and supplies the basic GUI of System 6, with Finder, Chooser, Desk Accessories, and Control Panels. It provisions Unix with the X Window System (X11R3) GUI, the Draft 12 POSIX standard, and overall improved speed comparable to a low end Sun workstation. Having its first POSIX compliant platform allowed Apple to join "a growing list of industry heavyweights" to be allowed into the US federal government's burgeoning $6 billion bid market, while remaining neutral in the Unix wars.

A/UX 2.0 was released in mid-1990, adding support for simultaneously windowed applications for Macintosh, Unix, and X Window upon the desktop. Unix World called it a "cost-effective way to break into UNIX" and MacUser said "A/UX is the most interesting and impressive software to have come out of Apple since HyperCard. A/UX 2.0 is not just great UNIX software – it's great Macintosh software."

In 1991, Apple's plans were influenced by the new AIM alliance with IBM, envisioning that A/UX should become the basis for drastically scaling the Macintosh system architecture and application compatibility across the computing industry, from personal to enterprise markets. Apple formed a new business division for enterprise systems, led by director Jim Groff to serve "large businesses, government, and higher education". Basing the division upon a maturing A/UX, Groff admitted that Apple was "not a major player" in the Unix market and had performed merely "quiet" marketing of the operating system, but fully intended to become a "major player" with "very broad-based marketing objectives" in 1992. Further, Apple believed the alliance with IBM would merge A/UX, AIX, and System 7 into one platform—thus ultimately scaling Macintosh applications from Mac desktops to huge IBM RS/6000 systems.

In November 1991, Apple launched A/UX 3.0, planning to synchronize the two concurrent release schedules of A/UX and System 7. At that time, the company also preannounced A/UX 4.0, expected for release in 1993 or 1994. The announcement expounded about AIM and its platform merger proposal, and about allowing AIM to enter what Apple believed to be an emerging "general desktop open systems market". A/UX 3.0 was positioned as an "important migration path" to this new system, making Unix and System 7 applications compliant with the PowerOpen specification. A/UX 4.0 was proposed to target the PowerOpen Environment ABI, merge AIX features into A/UX, and use the OSF/1 kernel from the Open Software Foundation. The future A/UX 4.0 and future AIX versions were intended for a variety of IBM's POWER and PowerPC hardware, and on Apple's PowerPC hardware.

...Apple agreed to provide IBM with the technology needed to allow standard Macintosh applications—starting with the Finder—to run under the new AIX, much as they do under A/UX today. Apple will apply the PowerOpen label to the new version of A/UX that results from the deal; IBM will do likewise with the new AIX.

— MacWeek

In April 1992, a C2-level secure version of A/UX was released. Coincidentally, the AIM alliance had launched the Apple/IBM partnership Taligent Inc. one month earlier, with the mission of bringing Apple's other next-generation operating system Pink to market as a universal operating system and application framework.

Contrary to all announcements, Apple eventually canceled A/UX 4.0. In 1995, PowerOpen was discontinued and Apple withdrew from the Taligent Inc. partnership in December. In 1996, Apple discontinued its Copland project which had spent two years in the public view, intended to become Mac OS 8 and to host Taligent software. From 1996 to 1997, the company deployed a short-lived platform of Apple Network Server systems based on PowerPC and a customized AIX. Apple's serially failed operating system strategy yielded no successor to the badly aged System 7. Apple acquired NeXT in 1996 and introduced Mac OS X Server 1.0 in 1999, which merged Mac OS 8 upon the Unix-based NeXTSTEP operating system.

The final release of A/UX is version 3.1.1 of 1995. Apple had abandoned A/UX completely by 1996.

Timeline of Mac operating systems

== Reception ==
A/UX 1.0 was criticized in the April 1988 InfoWorld review for having a largely command line interface as in other Unix variants, rather than graphical as in System 6. Its networking support was praised. BYTE in 1989 listed A/UX 1.1 among the "Excellence" winners of the BYTE Awards, stating that it "could make Unix the multitasking operating system of choice during the next decade" and challenge OS/2. Compared to contemporary workstations from other Unix vendors, however, the Macintosh hardware lacks features such as demand paging. The first two versions of A/UX consequently suffered poor performance, and poor sales. Users also complained about the amount of hard drive space it uses on a standard Macintosh, though comparable to any Unix system.

A/UX 2.0 was reviewed in the May 1991 issue of Unix World, on the IIfx and IIci. A/UX was described as a "cost-effective way to break into UNIX" compared to Intel-based Unix from Santa Cruz Operation and Interactive Systems Corporation, noting the inclusion of libraries, tools, and an X Window System server. A/UX was regarded as appealing to those wanting to run Mac OS, Unix, and MS-DOS (using SoftPC), or for those wanting a combination of the Macintosh environment with comprehensive support for Unix technologies from both System V and BSD. However, the price and performance of a suitably configured Macintosh IIfx system, at around $15,000 (equivalent to $35,500 in 2025), was said to "pale compared to a RISC workstation" such as Sun's SPARCstation 2, IBM's RS/6000 Model 320, and Hewlett-Packard's HP Apollo 9000 Model 720 systems. New Mac models with 68040 CPUs and A/UX compatibility were considered likely in the future. MacUser said that after months of lab testing, it "easily meets or exceeds nearly all our expectations. ... A/UX 2.0 is, on the whole, a superb combination of the Mac and UNIX System V 2.2 and 4.3 BSD extensions ... A/UX is the most interesting and impressive software to have come out of Apple since HyperCard. A/UX 2.0 is not just great UNIX software – it's great Macintosh software." The review considered system performance adequate except maybe for heavy use of CAD and compilers, even on the fastest Macintosh IIfx which has less UNIX speed than the average workstation like a SPARCstation 1+.

A/UX 3.0 was praised in the August 1992 issue of InfoWorld by the same author as the publication's 1988 review, describing it as "an open systems solution with the Macintosh at its heart" where "Apple finally gets Unix right". He praised the GUI, single-button point-and-click installer, one year of personal tech support, the graphical help dialogs, and the user's manuals, saying that A/UX "defies the stereotype that Unix is difficult to use" and is "the easiest version of Unix to learn". Its list price of $709 (equivalent to $1,600 in 2025) is much higher than that of "much weaker" competing PC operating systems such as System 7, OS/2, MS-DOS, and Windows 3.1, but low compared to the then prevailing proprietary Unix licenses of more than $2,000 (equivalent to $4,600 in 2025). The review found the system speed "acceptable but not great" even on the fastest Quadra 950, blaming not the software but the incomplete Unix optimization found in Apple's hardware. Though "a very good value", the system's price-performance ratio was judged as altogether uncompetitive against Sun's SPARCstation 2. The reviewers thought it unlikely for users "to want to buy Macs just to run A/UX" and would have awarded InfoWorld's top score if the OS was not proprietary to Macintosh hardware.

Tony Bove of the Bove & Rhodes Report generally complained that "[f]or Unix super-users there is no compelling reason to buy Apple's Unix. For Apple, A/UX has always been a way to sell Macs, not Unix; it's a check-off item for users."

=== Legacy ===
Vintage A/UX users had one central repository for most A/UX applications: an Internet server at NASA called Jagubox. It was administered by Jim Jagielski, who was also the editor of the A/UX FAQ.

== See also ==
- Executor, a third-party reverse-engineered reimplementation of System 7 as a Unix application
- Macintosh Application Environment, Apple's Mac OS application layer for third-party Unix systems
- Classic, a subsystem for Mac OS X
- macOS, Apple's current OS, descended from the Unix-based NeXTSTEP
- MachTen, Unix in the form of a Mac OS 7 application
- MacMach, an academic Mach-based Unix experiment providing System 7 as a Unix application
- MkLinux, Apple-sponsored Mach microkernel-based Linux on Macintosh hardware
- Star Trek project, System 7 ported as a DOS application for IBM PC clones
