= Ascendance =

Ascendance may refer to:

- Ascendance (novel), a novel by R.A. Salvatore
- Ascendance Records, an independent record label based in the UK
- The Ascendance Trilogy, a series of novels by Jennifer A. Nielsen

== See also ==
- Ascendancy (disambiguation)
- Ascendency, a quantitative attribute of an ecosystem
- Ancestrality
