= Ascension =

Ascension or ascending may refer to:

== Religion ==
- "Ascension", the belief in some religions that some individuals have ascended into Heaven without dying first. The Catholic concept of the Assumption of Mary leaves open the question of her death, while in Eastern Christianity the Dormition of the Mother of God presumes her death. In Mormonism, Translation is equivalent to Ascension.
- Ascension of Jesus
- Ascension of Muhammad, another name for Israʾ and Miʿraj
- Feast of the Ascension (Ascension day), an annual day of feast commemorating Jesus' ascension; a public holiday in several countries
- The Ascension, another title for the Old English poem Christ II
- Ascension Cathedral (disambiguation)
- The Ascension, Lavender Hill, an Anglo-Catholic church on Lavender Hill, Battersea, South West London

== Places ==
- Ascensión Municipality, Chihuahua, Mexico
  - Ascensión, Chihuahua, a city and capital of the municipality
- Ascensión de Guarayos, Santa Cruz Department, Bolivia
- Ascension Island, in the southern Atlantic Ocean
- Ascension Islands, a group of uninhabited islands in Canada
- Ascension, Prince Edward Island, Canada
- L'Ascension, Quebec, Canada
- Ascension Parish, Louisiana, United States
- Ascensión, Buenos Aires, Argentina

== Fiction ==
- Ascension (comic book), a comic book series (1997–2000) created by David Finch
- Ascension (Star Wars novel), 2011
- Ascension (Binge novel), 2023

== Film and TV ==
- The Climb (2017 film) (French title: L'ascension), a French adventure film
- Dracula II: Ascension, a 2003 direct-to-video American-Romanian horror film
- Ascension, an award-winning short film produced by Vickie Gest
- Ascension (miniseries), a television miniseries that aired in December 2014
- "Ascension" (The X-Files), a 1994 episode of The X-Files
- "Ascension", a 1999 episode of Batman Beyond
- Ascension (Stargate), in the Stargate universe, a process to become a noncorporeal entity on a higher plane of existence (first mentioned in season 3, 2000)
- "Ascension" (Stargate SG-1), a 2001 Stargate SG-1 episode
- "Ascension", a 2013 episode of NCIS: Los Angeles
- Ascension (Agents of S.H.I.E.L.D.), a 2016 Agents of S.H.I.E.L.D. episode
- David Blaine Ascension, a stunt by David Blaine in Page, Arizona, September 2, 2020
- Ascension (film), a 2021 American documentary film

== Games ==
- Mage: The Ascension, a role-playing game
- Ultima IX: Ascension, the final part of the computer role-playing game series Ultima
- God of War: Ascension, a 2013 game for the PlayStation 3
- Ascension: Chronicle of the Godslayer, a 2011 deck-building card game
- A game map in Zombie Mode in Call of Duty: Black Ops, from the "First Strike" map pack
- Kanye Quest 3030, which featured a secret map alleged to be linked to a cult religion referred to as "Ascensionism" through use of the password "ASCEND"

== Music ==
- L'Ascension, a suite for orchestra or organ by Olivier Messiaen
- Ascension, an alias used by the British trance music act The Space Brothers

=== Albums ===
- Ascension (A Flock of Seagulls album), 2018
- Ascension (Djam Karet album), 2001
- Ascension (Jesu album), 2011
- Ascension (John Coltrane album), 1966
- Ascension (Misia album), 2007
- Ascension (Paradise Lost album), 2025
- Ascension (Pep Love album), 2001
- The Ascension (2face Idibia album), 2014
- The Ascension (Glenn Branca album), 1981
- The Ascension (Otep album), 2007
- The Ascension (Phil Wickham album), 2013
- The Ascension (Sufjan Stevens album), 2020
- Ascension, by Michael Pinnella, 2014
- Ascension, by Toya Delazy, 2014
- The Afterman: Ascension, by progressive rock band Coheed and Cambria, 2012

=== Songs ===
- "Ascension" (Gorillaz song), by Gorillaz from Humanz, 2017
- "Ascension (Don't Ever Wonder)", by Maxwell from Maxwell's Urban Hang Suite, 1996
- "Ascension," the only song featured in the 1966 John Coltrane album Ascension
- "Ascension," by Born of Osiris from The Discovery, 2011
- "Ascension," by Enslaved from Isa, 2004
- "Ascension," by Fear Factory from Archetype, 2004
- "Ascension", by John Frusciante from Curtains, 2005
- "Ascension", by Killswitch Engage from Incarnate, 2016
- "Ascension", by Mac Miller from GO:OD AM, 2015
- "Ascension", by Vanessa Carlton from Liberman, 2015
- "The Ascension", by Manowar from Gods of War, 2007
- "Ascension (A)", by Sunn O))) from their album Pyroclasts, 2019
- "Ascensionism," by Sleep Token from Take Me Back to Eden, 2023

== Ships ==
- HMS Ascension (K502), a Royal Navy frigate in service from 1944 to 1946
- MV Ascension, a 1993 cargo and container ship

== Other ==
- Ascension (Calvo), an outdoor 1996 sculpture by Robert Calvo, in Portland, Oregon
- Ascension (Wercollier), 1978 and 1986 sculptures by Lucien Wercollier
- Ascension (healthcare system), a Catholic non-profit health system in the United States
- Ascension (publisher), A Catholic media publisher
- Ascension Road, Prince Edward Island Route 160, a highway in Canada
- The Ascension (professional wrestling), a WWE wrestling tag team

== See also ==
- Ascend (disambiguation)
- Assumption of Mary, Mother of Jesus, into Heaven
- Asunción
- Asunción (disambiguation)
- Mi'raj, heavenly ascent of the Islamic prophet Muhammad
- Right ascension, half of an astronomical coordinate system
