= Ascend =

Ascend may refer to:

- Ascend (Greg Howe album), 1999
- Ascend (Nine Lashes album), 2016
- Ascend (Illenium album), 2019
- ASCEND, mathematical modelling/simulation software
- Ascend Airways
- Ascend Communications, an Alameda, California-based manufacturer of communications equipment
- Ascend: Hand of Kul, an Xbox 360 and PC game by Signal Studios
- Ascend Group, a e-commerce company headquartered in Bangkok, Thailand
- Huawei Ascend (disambiguation), a brand name used by Huawei for microchips and smartphones

== See also ==
- Ascent (disambiguation)
- Ascension (disambiguation)
- Ascender (disambiguation)
- Ascendency in ecology
- Ascendant, in astrology
- Ascendancy (disambiguation)
