= MachTen =

Unix-like operating system

- Developer: Tenon Intersystems
- OS family: Unix-like BSD
- Working state: Discontinued
- Source model: Closed source
- Latest release: 4.1.4 / February 2000; 26 years ago
- Supported platforms: Macintosh: Motorola 68000, then PowerPC
- Kernel type: Microkernel
- License: Commercial, proprietary
- Official website: tenon.com/products/machten

MachTen is a Unix-like operating system from Tenon Intersystems. It is based on the Mach kernel, 4.4BSD, GNU programming tools, and the X Window System. It runs not natively but as a classic Mac OS application program in a virtual machine.

Unlike Apple's contemporary A/UX, which boots natively from a dedicated partition, the MachTen application shares the host's Hierarchical File System (HFS). Tenon released the original version for Motorola 68000 processors in 1991, followed by Power MachTen for the PowerPC architecture in 1995. The product was discontinued in October 2001, citing the successor Mac OS X.

== History ==
MachTen development started in 1989, and the first release in 1991 has Mach 2.5 and 4.3BSD-Reno. The second release in 1992 has the X Window System. Early releases do not support System 7, and later versions support System 6 with MultiFinder, and System 7.

In 1993, release 2.1 introduced virtual memory, memory protection, and an improved paging model for Mac applications. Since then, MachTen was published as Personal MachTen, and Professional MachTen with development tools and virtual memory. Release 2.1.1 was announced in 1994, introducing virtual memory support for Motorola 68040. Professional MachTen for Motorola 68000-based Macintoshes ended with release 2.3, announced in 1996 for low-cost web servers.

In 1995, Power MachTen was launched for Power Macintosh, with release 4.0 supporting shared libraries and memory-mapped files, and a 4.4BSD-based, POSIX-compliant distribution. Release 4.1 was in March 1998, and 4.1.1 in July 1998 with discounted prices. Power MachTen lacks some of the features of Professional MachTen (including true virtual memory and memory protection) but is PowerPC native and is compatible with Mac OS 9 through its final version, 4.1.4, released in February 2000. Tenon discontinued MachTen in October 2001, citing the release of Mac OS X as a successor.

== Overview ==
Unlike Apple's A/UX, which boots natively and runs System 7 as a Unix application based on a Unix port of Mac OS Toolbox, MachTen runs an entire Unix operating system as a Mac application. This approach hosts the BSD Fast File System on the Hierarchical File System (HFS), imposing HFS limitations on Unix, including 31-character filenames. Other filesystems such as Network File System volumes are unaffected. However, this implementation allows Unix programs transparent access to any Mac files and without a dedicated partition.

Filesystem performance in the shell is reportedly around three times slower than A/UX and six times slower than Finder equivalents, though Finder operations are only marginally slowed down. However, Finder operations were only marginally slowed alongside MachTen, in contrast with a two-fold slowdown in A/UX. MacUser described file-intensive GNU C Compiler performance on MachTen as "painful" in version 2.0.

Other integration features include embedding the Internet Protocol in AppleTalk network packets, which enables the traditional Unix networking such as FTP, Telnet, remote login, and Sendmail. This effectively integrates TCP/IP with LocalTalk without disrupting AppleTalk. However, this encapsulation results in lower transfer rates than A/UX and "sluggish" performance.

MachTen does not require a memory management unit, broadening the audience over A/UX's hardware restrictions. In its first version, this enables Unix programs to "bring down the entire system". so later versions have memory protection and paging for Unix programs on MMU machines. Early versions lack virtual memory but compared to A/UX's requirement of a "high-end Mac and a lot of disk space", MachTen has lower system requirements and greater Mac application compatibility. Later versions introduce memory protection and paging for Unix, for MMU systems.

Although MachTen reportedly used the Mach 3.0 microkernel since MachTen version 2.0, reviewers noted that Mach 3.0 was yet to be adopted, along with usage of 4.4BSD that would be free of AT&T code, this being of concern with the UNIX System Laboratories, Inc. v. Berkeley Software Design, Inc. lawsuit ongoing. Other Mach-based systems were identified as competitors, including the AIM alliance's PowerOpen Environment for PowerPC in which OSF/1 was planned to "combine A/UX and AIX", and the including 68k-based MacMach from CMU which had created Mach. However, MacMach's licensing restrictions made the product unattractive outside of academia and enterprises. IBM and Apple later proposed a Mac OS personality for the prototype Workplace OS which is based on Mach 3.0.

== See also ==
- MkLinux
- NeXTSTEP
