= Ascent =

Ascent or The Ascent may refer to:

== Publications ==
- Ascent (magazine), an independent, not-for-profit magazine
- Ascent (journal), a literary journal based at Concordia College
- Ascent (novel), by Jed Mercurio
- Times Ascent, a weekly supplement of The Times of India newspaper

== Film and TV ==
- The Ascent (1977 film), a Soviet film set in World War II
- The Ascent (1994 film), an American war adventure film
- The Ascent (2019 film), also known as Black Ops or Stairs, is a 2019 action horror film
- Kodiyettam (Ascent), 1977 Indian film written and directed by Adoor Gopalakrishnan
- "The Ascent" (Star Trek: Deep Space Nine), a 1996 episode of the television series Star Trek: Deep Space Nine
- "Ascent" (American Crime Story), an episode of the second season of American Crime Story
- "Ascent" (Dead Zone), an episode of The Dead Zone
- The Ascent (Ninjago), an episode of Ninjago

== Music ==
- Ascents (album), 2000 album by Dennis Bayne Culp
- The Ascent (Wiley album), 2013 album by rapper Wiley
- The Ascent (Secrets album), 2012 debut album by post hardcore band Secrets

== Business ==
- Ascent Solar, a solar power company in the United States
- Ascent Media, a holding company
- The Ascent at Roebling's Bridge, a residential building in Covington, Kentucky
- Subaru Ascent, an SUV

== Other uses ==
- Ascent (aeronautics) or climb, increasing the altitude of an aircraft
- The Ascent (video game), an action role-playing video game
- Ascent propulsion system, a rocket engine
- Colorado Springs Ascent, a defunct American soccer team
- Ascent (font), the distance between the baseline and the top of a glyph in typeface

== See also ==
- Ascend (disambiguation)
- Accent (disambiguation)
