= Kanye Zone =

2012 browser video game

- Developer: Otter Spice Productions
- Designers: Michael Frederickson; Stephen Barlow
- Platform: Web browser
- Release: March 9, 2012
- Genre: Action
- Mode: Single-player

Kanye Zone is a browser game developed by Otter Spice Productions. It was released on March 9, 2012, and involves the player controlling a bumper in order to prevent an image of American musician Kanye West's head from entering a circle of increasing size, referred to as his "zone". The game incorporates sound clips from West's song "Niggas in Paris", and its premise is a parody of the song's lyrics.

Created by roommates Michael Frederickson and Stephen Barlow and inspired by 1980s video games, Kanye Zone received considerable media attention: Frederickson was interviewed by MTV, and several other news outlets reported on the game, some praising its simplicity and addictiveness. In May 2013, a follow-up game, titled Pitbull Party and based on the rapper Pitbull, was released.

== Gameplay ==
Kanye's head about to enter the zone, with the bumper opposite

The player's left and right arrow keys and space bar control a bumper that moves around a purple circle. Kanye West, represented by his head, attempts to enter the circle while repeatedly rapping "Don't let me into my zone", and the player must hit him with the bumper—this causes him to disappear in a burst of dollar signs, and the player is rewarded with cash, added to a total displayed on the webpage. A silhouette of Kanye's head shows where he will next spawn, and an arrow inside it indicates what direction he will travel in. Play continues this way, with Kanye getting faster and the zone getting bigger, until the player fails to prevent Kanye from entering the zone, when they are presented with a message declaring they have lost; an image of rapper Jay-Z's head joins that of West, and the lyric "I'm definitely in my zone" is heard. If the player's cash score is high enough, it is added to a leaderboard on the right of the page.

== Development ==
The game was created by roommates Michael Frederickson—a technical director at Pixar—and Stephen Barlow using HTML5. The two heard Kanye West's song "Niggas in Paris" and became "obsessed" with the lyric "Don't let me into my zone" (which is probably a reference to West's "artistic zone"), and what it would mean to do so. It was inspired by 1980s games such as Pac-Man, as well as the 1972 game Pong. They noted that although they tried to make the rest of the game "flashy", the zone had to be "this unremarkable geometric form" so as not to be distracting.

There were a lot of questions like that we had to grapple with while creating this game. I feel like honestly Kanye West has asked them of us as a society and it's kind of our duty to answer them now. This game is an environment to help people do that.

— the game's co-creator Michael Frederickson

Frederickson mused that the nature of Kanye's zone is "the whole question of the game", and agreed that it was "almost a philosophical question". Frederickson called West, the inspiration for the game, an "arrogant man who purports to know everything", and said that in the game he "[admits] some ignorance" as he "doesn't know exactly what'll happen if he gets in the zone." The fact that the player begins the game with $50,000 is a reference to the "Niggas in Paris" lyric "What's 50 grand to a mothafucka like me, can you please remind me"—the amount represents nothing.

== Release ==
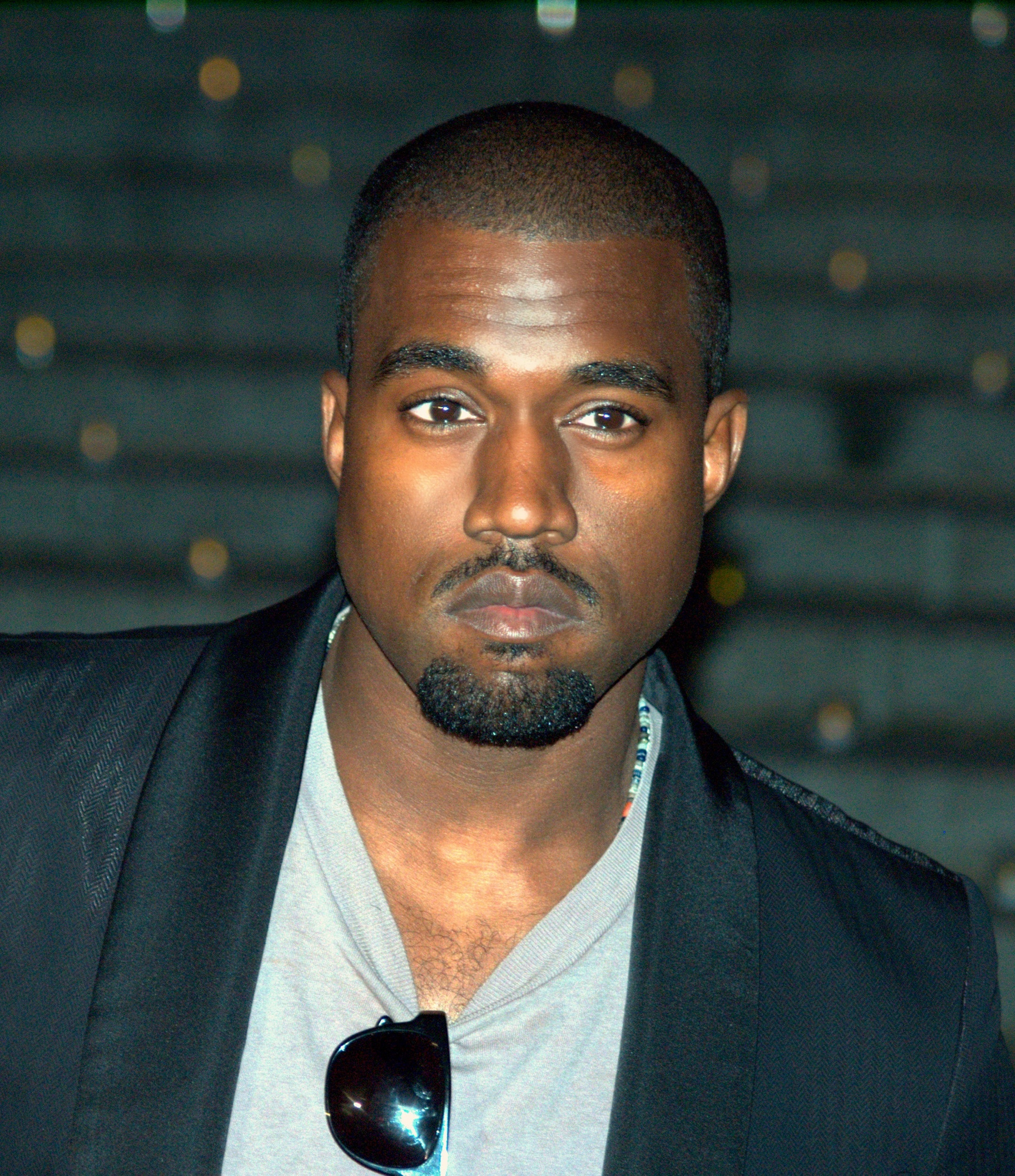
The game features and parodies the American hip hop artist Kanye West.

Kanye Zone was released on March 9, 2012 by Otter Spice Productions, and Michael Frederickson promoted it at the Game Developers Conference. Following its release, Kanye Zone reached the front page of the social news website Reddit, causing its creators to lose approximately US$700 after much traffic was driven to the website, and necessitating the compression of its contents; the next day, advertisements were added to the page. Although two million games had been played in under a month, the game was not very profitable, as the creators made only eight dollars off the game. The developers have since created a store selling various items adorned with a picture of the "zone", which Frederickson describes as "purple circles on everything".

Although Kanye West has not contacted him, Frederickson was interviewed about the game by MTV's Hive, which said it is "the best video game ever created based on a pop song and/or artist" and compared it to other games based on the song "Margaritaville" and the band Grateful Dead—he described the interview "unthinkably disproportionate to the interest of Kanye Zone"; it even verged into the discussion of a film adaptation. He was also a guest on the British video gaming radio show One Life Left. Luke Plunkett of Kotaku called the game a "perversely addictive thing", and Complex's Jacob Moore said it is "as basic as it can get, but that won't stop you from wasting hours of your day." Metro dubbed Kanye Zone "the dumbest game you will spend 20 minutes playing" and "a hilarious low impact game in the tradition of early Atari".

In March 2012, Frederickson stated that he was not yet working on a sequel to the game; however, on May 31, 2013, Pitbull Party, a follow-up to Kanye Zone, was released. Based on Pitbull's song "Don't Stop the Party" and released by Otter Spice Productions, it involves maneuvering Pitbull's head between scratches on turntable records.

== Shutdown and Reopening ==
In December 2022, the game was replaced with a message stating:

Hello,

For abundantly obvious reasons, Kanye Zone has been taken down. This site is an elaborate joke that is no longer funny.

We appreciate you dropping by.

The replacement of the game was done in response to Kanye West's public praising of Adolf Hitler and his anti-Semitic remarks. But as early as July 2023, the game was reopened, and the website went back to functioning as it once did.

== See also ==
- Kanye Quest 3030 – 2013 video game
- "Fishsticks"—a South Park episode that also parodies West
