= Robert Ulanowicz =

American theoretical ecologist

- Born: 17 September 1943 (age 82); Baltimore, Maryland
- Education: Johns Hopkins University
- Awards: 2007 Ilya Prigogine Medal
- Scientific career
- Fields: Theoretical ecology; Thermodynamics
- Workplaces: University of Maryland University of Florida

Robert Edward Ulanowicz (/jəˈlænəwɪts/ yə-LAN-ə-wits; born 17 September 1943) is an American theoretical ecologist and philosopher of Polish descent who in his search for a unified theory of ecology has formulated a paradigm he calls Process Ecology. He was born September 17, 1943, in Baltimore, Maryland.

He served as professor of theoretical ecology at the University of Maryland Center for Environmental Science's Chesapeake Biological Laboratory in Solomons, Maryland, until his retirement in 2008. Ulanowicz received both his BS and PhD in chemical engineering from Johns Hopkins University in 1964 and 1968, respectively.

Ulanowicz currently resides in Gainesville, Florida, where he holds a courtesy professorship in the Department of Biology at the University of Florida. Since relocating to Florida, Ulanowicz has served as a scientific advisor to the Howard T. Odum Florida Springs Institute, an organization dedicated to the preservation and welfare of Florida's natural springs.

== Overview ==
Ulanowicz uses techniques from information theory and thermodynamics to study the organization of flows of energy and nutrients within ecosystems. Although his ideas have been primarily applied in ecology, many of his concepts are abstract and have been applied to other areas in which flow networks arise, such as psychology and economics.

Though Ulanowicz began his career modeling ecological systems using differential equations, he soon reached the limits of this approach. Realizing that any ecosystem is a complex system, he decided to move away from what he saw as the inappropriate use of the reductionist approach, and instead began to work towards development of theoretical measures of the ecosystem as a whole, such as ascendency. Gradually, he came to appreciate the ecosystem behavior is not simply a matter of "mechanics with noise," but rather an intricate interplay between opposing tendencies—autocatalytic-like self-organization and entropic decay. This natural conversation could be followed quantitatively using information-theoretic measures applied to networks of trophic processes.

Following Gregory Bateson, Ulanowicz points out how ecology differs significantly from physics in that constraints that are absent play important roles in ecosystem dynamics. He also argues how the homogeneous laws of physics only constrain the behavior of very heterogeneous ecosystems but are incapable by themselves of determining outcomes. He goes so far as to suggest that an entirely new metaphysics, which he calls Process Ecology, is required to understand complex living systems.

One pertinent discovery by Ulanowicz was that ecosystems do not progress to maximum efficiency. Ecosystems that channel too much activity along the most efficient pathways do so at the expense of redundant, less-efficient processes that can function to take over vital activities in the event that the more efficient processes are disrupted. Ecosystems that persist are those that achieve a balance between the mutually exclusive attributes of efficiency and reliability. This result from nature poses a significant challenge to mainstream economics, wherein market efficiency is held to be the sine qua non.

== Publications ==
Ulanowicz has authored or co-authored over two hundred articles in theoretical ecology and related areas of philosophy, especially those dealing with autocatalysis and causality. He has authored three books to date.

- A Third Window: Natural Life Beyond Newton and Darwin, Templeton Foundation Press (2009) (ISBN 159947154X)--A description of Ulanowicz's new metaphysics
- Ecology: The Ascendant Perspective, Columbia University Press (1997) (ISBN 0231108281) - Causality in living systems, written for a more general audience
- Growth and Development - Ecosystems phenomenology, Springer (1986) (ISBN 0387962654) - A more technical exposition of Ulanowicz's early ideas

== Palms ==
While living in Maryland, Ulanowicz took up a hobby of cultivating and casually breeding cold-hardy palm trees; he drew attention for a Windmill palm on Solomons Island that grew taller than the one-story building it was planted outside.

== Awards ==
Ulanowicz was named the recipient of the 2007 Ilya Prigogine Medal for outstanding research in ecological systems. He participated in the Stock Exchange of Visions project in 2007.

Ulanowicz was a featured speaker at the 2009 Ill STOQ International Conference entitled "Biological Evolution: Facts and Theories," which discussed the impacts and effects of the publication of On the Origin of Species by Charles Darwin.

== See also ==
- List of American philosophers
- Ascendency
