= Ascendancy =

Ascendancy may refer to:

- Protestant Ascendancy, Anglo-Irish ruling class of Ireland from the 17th to early 20th centuries
- Ascendancy (album), a 2005 album by Trivium
- Ascendancy (film), a 1983 British film
- Ascendancy (video game), a 1995 video game
- Ascendency, sometimes spelled "ascendancy", a quantitative attribute of an ecosystem

== See also ==
- Ascend (disambiguation)
- Ascender (disambiguation)
