= Lites =

Discontinued Unix-like operating system

- Developer: Johannes Helander, Helsinki University of Technology; Flux Research Group, University of Utah
- Written in: C, assembly language
- OS family: Unix-like (4.4BSD)
- Working state: Discontinued
- Source model: Open-source
- Final release: 1.1.u3 / 30 March 1996; 28 years ago
- Repository: www.cs.utah.edu/flux/lites/html/
- Marketing target: Research
- Available in: English
- Update method: Compile from source code
- Platforms: x86, MIPS, Alpha, PA-RISC, PC532
- Kernel type: Microkernel
- Default user interface: Command-line interface
- License: BSD
- Official website: www.cs.utah.edu/flux/lites/html/lites-info.html

Lites is a discontinued Unix-like operating system, based on 4.4BSD and the Mach microkernel. Specifically, Lites is a multi-threaded server and emulation library that provided unix functions to a Mach-based system. At the time of its release, Lites provided binary compatibility with 4.4BSD, NetBSD, FreeBSD, 386BSD, UX (4.3BSD), and Linux.

Lites was originally written by Johannes Helander at Helsinki University of Technology, and was further developed by the Flux Research Group at the University of Utah.

== See also ==
- HPBSD
