= Ascension Cathedral =

Ascension Cathedral may refer to:

- Ascension Cathedral, Almaty, Kazakhstan
- Ascension Cathedral, Novocherkassk, Russia
- Ascension Cathedral, Pushkin, Russia
- Ascension Cathedral, Satu Mare, Romania
- Ascension Cathedral, Veliko Tarnovo, Bulagia
- Ascension Convent in the Moscow Kremlin (demolished)
- Ascension Greek Orthodox Cathedral of Oakland, California, United States
- Ascension of the Lord Cathedral, Târgu Mureș, Romania
- Co-Cathedral of the Ascension of the Lord, Kecskemét, Hungary
