= Niggas in Paris =

2011 single by Jay-Z and Kanye West

Single by Jay-Z and Kanye West

from the album Watch the Throne
- Released: September 13, 2011
- Recorded: 2010–2011
- Studio: Le Meurice (Paris); The Mercer Hotel (New York)
- Genre: Hip hop; EDM
- Length: 3:39
- Label: Roc-A-Fella; Roc Nation; Def Jam
- Songwriters: Kanye West; Shawn Carter; Chauncey Hollis; Mike Dean; W.A. Donaldson
- Producers: Hit-Boy; Kanye West; Mike Dean

Jay-Z singles chronology
"Lift Off" (2011)	"Niggas in Paris" (2011)	"Why I Love You" (2011)

Kanye West singles chronology
"Amen" (2011)	"Niggas in Paris" (2011)	"Why I Love You" (2011)

Music video
- "Niggas in Paris" on YouTube

"Niggas in Paris" (censored as "Ni**as in Paris") is a song by American rappers Jay-Z and Kanye West from their collaborative studio album, Watch the Throne (2011). The song was produced by Hit-Boy with West and Mike Dean, while Anthony Kilhoffer contributed additional production. The producers served as co-writers with Jay-Z and Reverend W.A. Donaldson, the latter of whom was credited due to a sample of his work. Jay-Z envisioned the song's concept as how the two obtained their wealth, instead of showing it off. Pusha T was originally offered the beat, yet rejected it due to the playful sound. The beat was crafted by Hit-Boy and went unused until he was called by Don C, and he then provided it for the song. On September 13, 2011, the song was released to US rhythmic and urban contemporary radio stations as the album's fourth single, through Def Jam, Roc Nation, and Roc-A-Fella.

An uptempo hip-hop and club song with elements of West Coast rap, "Niggas in Paris" features a minimalist beat and samples from "Baptizing Scene" by Donaldson. The song also samples a couple of excerpts of Will Ferrell and Jon Heder from the sports comedy film, Blades of Glory (2007). Lyrically, it carries a theme of black empowerment as Jay-Z and West discuss defying their odds to achieve extensive wealth and success. Jay-Z envisions he would have elsewise found himself in jail, while West asserts that his doctors diagnosed him with an illness for his realness. The song received acclaim from music critics, who highlighted Jay-Z and West's verses. Some praised the synthesizer driven production and focus was also placed on the samples from Blades of Glory, while some critics saw it as an album highlight.

The song was named to year-end lists for 2011 by multiple publications, such as Pitchfork and Rolling Stone. It was awarded Best Rap Performance and Best Rap Song at the 55th Annual Grammy Awards, alongside winning Track of the Year and Best Club Banger at the 2012 BET Hip Hop Awards. Later appearing on retrospective lists of numerous outlets, "Niggas in Paris" was ranked as the 81st best song of all time by NME in 2014. The song reached number five on the US Billboard Hot 100, becoming the 11th top-five hit for Jay-Z and the 10th for West on the chart. Also in the United States, it topped the US Hot R&B/Hip-Hop Songs and Hot Rap Songs charts. The song also reached the top-10 in the likes of Canada, Scotland, and the United Kingdom. It was certified diamond in the US by the Recording Industry Association of America, standing as Jay-Z's first single to achieve this certification and West's second. The song further received triple platinum certifications in Denmark and the UK by IFPI Danmark and the British Phonographic Industry, respectively.

An accompanying music video was premiered at the entrance to Shoreditch High Street railway station in February 2012, using split screen kaleidoscopic effects to go between Jay-Z and West performing the song at the Staples Center and footage of their crowd. The music video received a nomination for Video of the Year at the 2012 BET Awards, while it was nominated for Best Editing and Best Hip-Hop Video at the 2012 MTV Video Music Awards. Jay-Z and West performed the song repeatedly at concerts on the Watch the Throne Tour (2011–12), providing their largest number of consecutive performances at a concert in Paris. The rappers performed the song three times for Jay-Z's set at BBC Radio 1's Hackney Weekend in 2012, three years before West delivered a performance of it at the Glastonbury Festival. The song was used as a soundtrack across different forms of media, including Otter Spice Productions' browser game, Kanye Zone (2012). Katy Perry performed an acoustic version of it for BBC Radio 1's Live Lounge in March 2012, replacing the explicit language with alternate phrases. In October 2011, the remix of "Niggas in Paris" was released, featuring a verse from T.I.

== Background and recording ==
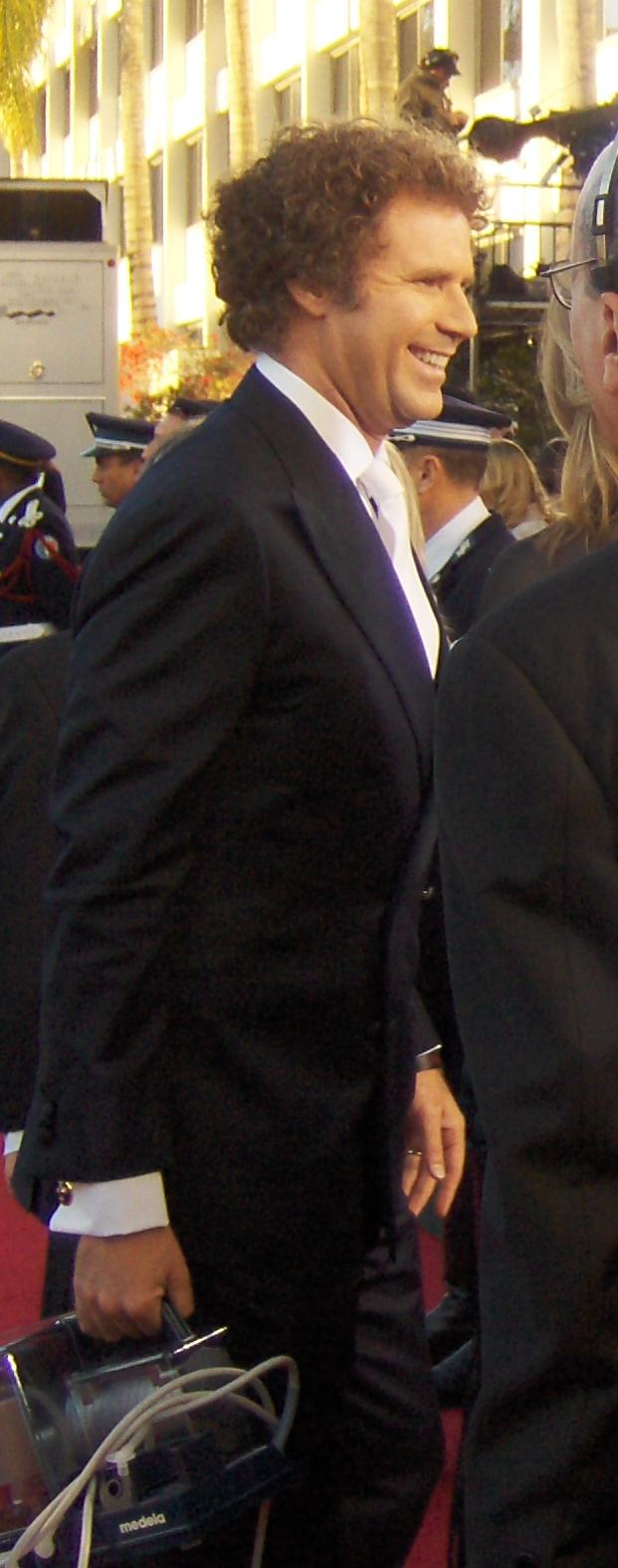
The song samples excerpts from Will Ferrell's appearance in Blades of Glory (2007), which created a surreal feel that he enjoyed.

Jay-Z and West are both American rappers who have collaborated on several tracks together, such as the singles "Swagga Like Us" (2008), "Run This Town" (2009), and "Monster" (2010). In 2010, the two began production and recording together for a collaborative record titled Watch the Throne. West revealed that "Niggas in Paris" was inspired by the range of experiences he witnessed when traveling to Paris, where he had an office and a small courtyard near the retailer Colette. Speaking with GQ in November 2011, Jay-Z explained that the song's concept is focused on how him and West obtained their wealth rather than flaunting this at everybody. During a concert at Madison Square Garden in New York City for The Yeezus Tour on November 24, 2013, West said that the song would not exist if it was not for him viewing singer Lenny Kravitz as "the first nigga in Paris" with his rock star persona from being with models and wearing clothes from designer Rick Owens.

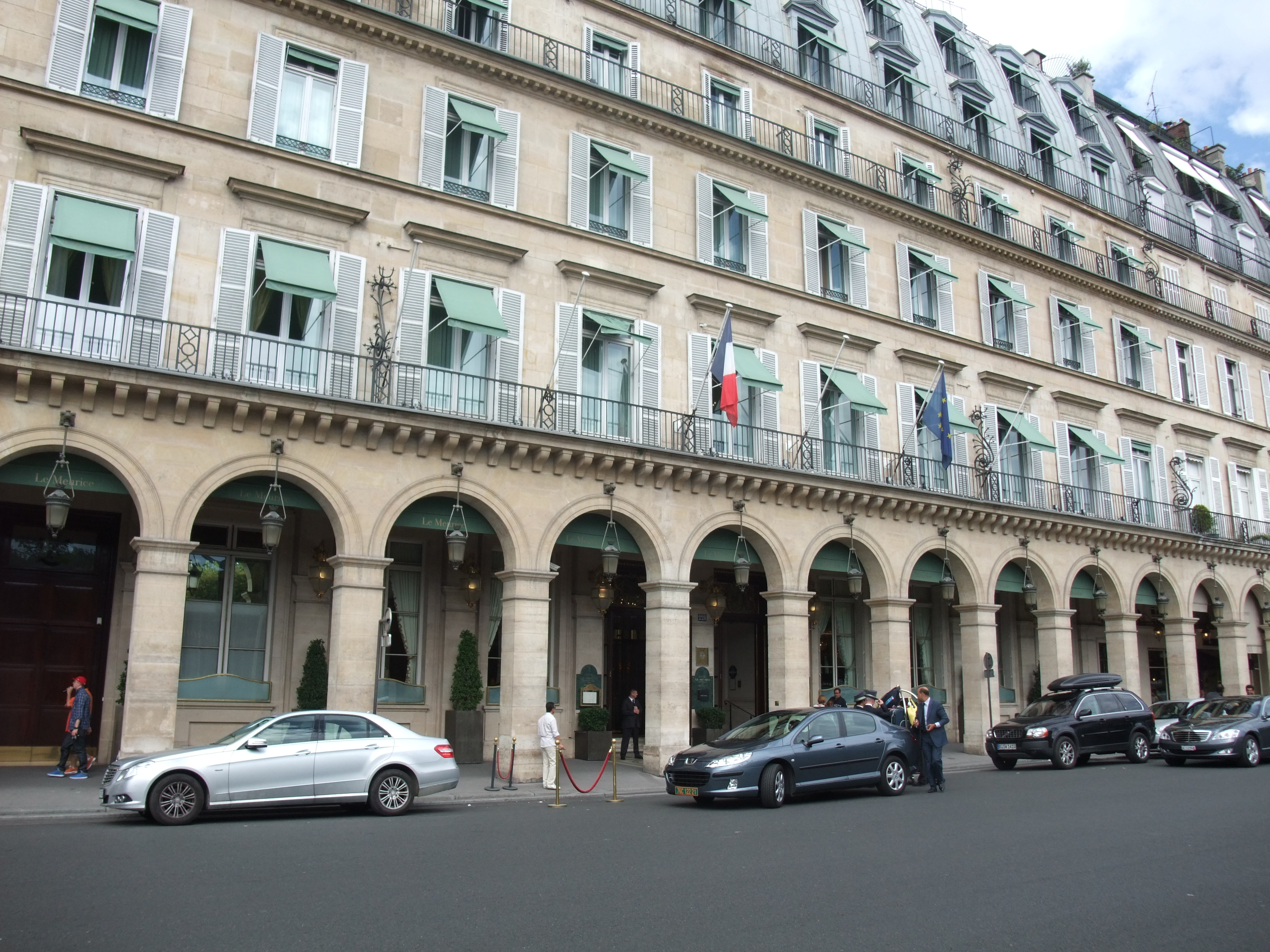
Jay-Z and West started recording the song during their sessions at Paris' Le Meurice hotel in November 2010.

The song was produced by Hit-Boy, West, and Mike Dean, with additional production from Anthony Kilhoffer. The beat was made by record producer Hit-Boy, who had met West in 2007 and Jay-Z through him, and had previously crafted several rejected beats for the project. Hit-Boy had planned on giving the beat to his associate Chilly Chill before receiving a call from Don C asking for it. The producers co-wrote the song with Jay-Z, while Reverend W.A. Donaldson received a songwriting credit due to being sampled. West came up with the idea of sampling a couple of excerpts from actor Will Ferrell's character Chazz Michael Michaels in the 2007 sports comedy film Blades of Glory. During the album's sessions, West offered the beat of "Niggas in Paris" to fellow rapper and GOOD Music signee Pusha T, who rejected it as he felt it too playful for his disposition. Parts of the song were taken from the album's sessions at the Le Meurice hotel in Paris during November 2010, while the later sessions at The Mercer Hotel were held over three weeks in 2011.

== Composition and lyrics ==
"Niggas In Paris" (2011)
A 22-second sample of "Niggas In Paris", showcasing the icy synthesizers, kick drums, and Hit-Boy's bleeps in the minimalist production. West begins his verse as he comes in at the end of Jay-Z's performance, rapping the phrase "that shit cray!"

Musically, "Niggas in Paris" is an uptempo hip hop and club song, with elements of West Coast rap. The song begins with an excerpt of Ferrell's declaration from Blades of Glory: "We're gonna skate to one song and one song only." It later samples Ferrell talking about how art does not need any meaning when "it's provocative ... it gets the people going", which appears in the middle of West's verse and was interpreted by Rolling Stone's Matthew Perpetua as summarizing the lyrical style of hip hop. The song also features samples of Reverend W. A. Donaldson's "Baptizing Scene" (1960). It has a slow, cheerful minimalist beat, which incorporates bounciness. The beat is driven by a riff of stabs of looped icy synthesizers, combined with kick drums. The song includes Hit Boy's bleeps, while a braggadocio flow is used by Jay-Z and West. Jay-Z raps fast, whereas West begins in half-time before moving to a faster pace. In the middle of the song, it transitions from continuous snare shots and orchestration of staccato electronics to an 808 breakdown. The breakdown contains industrial sounds, distorted thumping sub-bass, and operatic backing vocals. For the last 30 seconds, the song is dominated by a dubstep drop. The ending features studio buzz, synthesized monk voices, and static bursts.

The lyrics of "Niggas in Paris" are themed around black empowerment, with Jay-Z and West discussing how they defied the odds of their backgrounds to obtain extensive wealth and success. Jay-Z uses his verse to envision that had he not achieved success, he would have ended up in jail with his peers as he appreciates his freedom. The rapper lists out different elements of his success such as drinks and clothing, while he justifies his arrival to Paris by rapping that if others escaped what he had they would be there "getting fucked up too". West references the royal theme of Watch the Throne by imagining himself as Prince William of Wales in the wake of his marriage to Catherine Middleton, deciding he would instead marry the twins Mary-Kate and Ashley Olsen. He declares that he has been diagnosed with an illness by his doctors, who apparently said he is "suffering from realness". The rapper teases entering his zone and offers the ad-lib "hah?!", as well as rapping the phrases "going gorillas" and "that shit cray!" The performers trade lines with each other, including Jay-Z boasting about having his "hot bitch" at home and West retorting by asking how many of these he owns himself.

== Release and promotion ==
On August 8, 2011, "Niggas in Paris" was included as the third track on Jay-Z and West's collaborative studio album Watch The Throne, a month before they unveiled its cover art with the same motif as that of their single "Otis". The artwork displays the performers' names and the song's title in white letters against the colours of the French flag. Jay-Z and West invoked the cover for "Why I Love You", which was released as a single to rhythmic contemporary radio stations in the United States simultaneously with "Niggas in Paris" on September 13, 2011, through their record labels Def Jam, Roc Nation, and Roc-A-Fella. On the same date, the former was sent to US urban contemporary radio stations by the aforementioned labels. "Niggas in Paris" was later serviced to US mainstream radio stations by Roc-A-Fella and Def Jam on November 8, 2011.

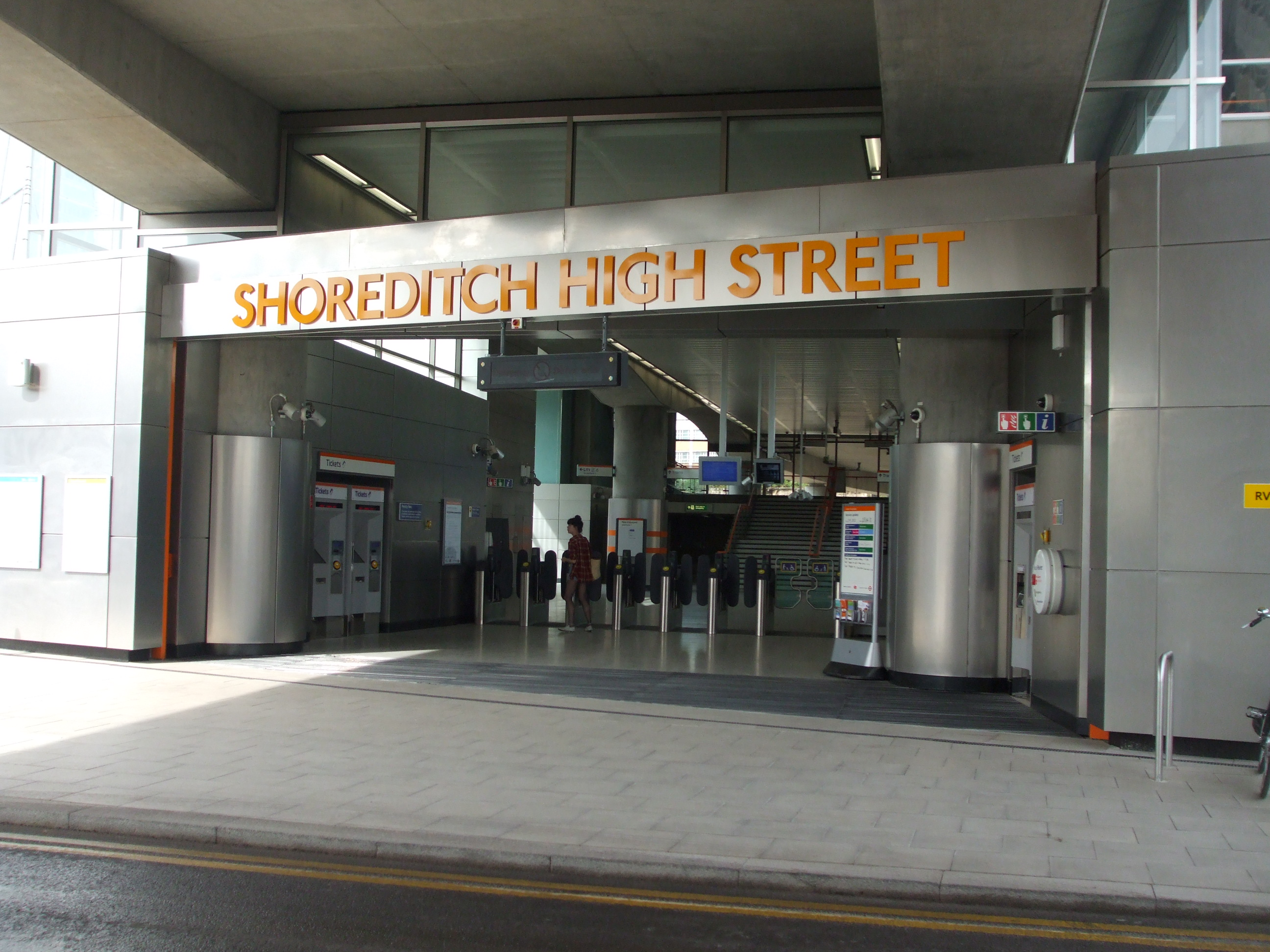
For its premiere in February 2012, the song's music video was projected onto the entrance of Shoreditch High Street railway station in East London (pictured).

On February 9, 2012, Jay-Z and West premiered the music video for "Niggas in Paris" with a projection at the front of East London's Shoreditch High Street railway station. The video followed "Otis" as the second visual from Watch the Throne, with its footage taken from the rappers' concert at Los Angeles' Staples Center on their accompanying tour in December 2011. After performing the song, Jay-Z announced the video had been filmed live at the venue. The music video was self-directed by West, with Jon handling the production. Good Company worked on post-production, while Daniel Pearl served as the director of photography.

The music video is preceded by an epilepsy warning, informing people that it may trigger their seizures and advising of viewer discretion. The video utilizes split screen kaleidoscopic effects to jump from Jay-Z and West performing the song at the Staples Center to footage of the crowd, which mostly features models. Mirror images are shown of the performance, which the camera pans in to. The visual incorporates laser-lights, roars from lions, and imagery of Paris landmarks such as Notre-Dame de Paris. For the excerpt from Blades of Glory that interrupts West's verse, a brief snippet of Ferrell's appearance in the film is displayed.

The music video received a nomination for Video of the Year at the 2012 BET Awards, losing the award to "Otis". At the 2012 MTV Video Music Awards, the visual was nominated for the awards of Best Editing and Best Hip-Hop Video. The video received a nomination for Best Hip-Hop Video at the 2012 Antville Music Video Awards, while it was nominated for Best International Urban Video at the 2012 UK Music Video Awards. As of June 12, 2023, the music video has received over 386 million views on YouTube.

== Reception ==
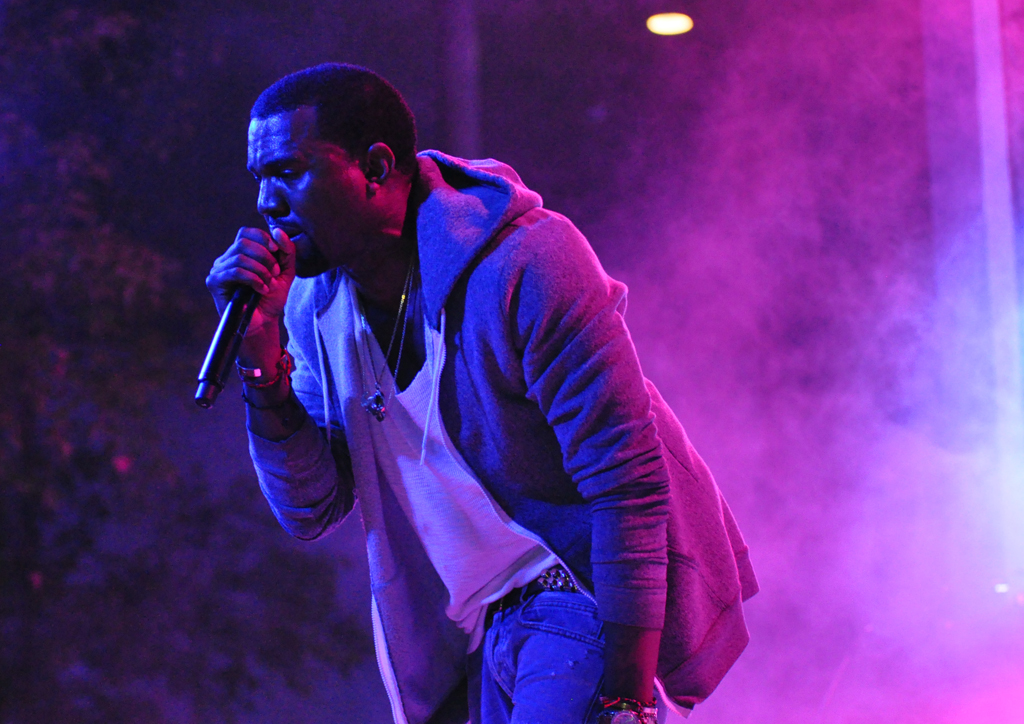
Numerous reviewers placed focus on West's verse, often appreciating his lyrical style.

The song was met with widespread acclaim from music critics, with praise going towards Jay-Z and West's performances. Writing for Pitchfork, Tom Breihan was impressed with the song's "propulsive synth riff and gigantic drums" as Jay-Z showcases his technical rap skills, while he highlighted West's lyrics about his apparent illness. Michaelangelo Matos of The Guardian called the "percolating track" a standout on Watch the Throne for invoking Wiley's production, comparing the "sick sub-bass" and a snare to static. Matos hailed Jay-Z and West's performances, commenting that the phrase "that shit cray" leaves the word crazy unfinished.

Paste's Ryan Reed asserted that the song proves why Jay-Z and West seemingly operating on a basis of using their first takes is good, praising its hypnotic feel. Reed considered that Jay-Z's "rhythmic gymnastics feel like spontaneous genius" despite him sounding fully possessed, while he found the "simple, synth-driven beat" to be a strong match for the minimal production. The staff of XXL saw the song as an album standout and a centerpiece of the rappers' aims to "shatter a caste system", discussing the luxury of their watches and wealth as the rappers acknowledge being a minority in how they achieved success "over Hit-Boy's pulsating production". Cokemachineglow's Calum Marsh declared that it features the first earnest rapping from Jay-Z and West on the album, as the latter's "leering flow sets the standard". For Prefix Mag, Dave Park praised Jay-Z's lyrics about his past and commented how West "stop[s] at nothing to match wares with his one-time idol", interjecting himself after his lines.

While Perpetua from Rolling Stone praised Jay-Z and West's performances "over a slow, menacing beat and icy synthesizer notes", he saw the song's highlight as the unexpected excerpt from Blades of Glory about the lack of art's meaning that essentially summarizes "the art of hip-hop lyrics". Erika Ramirez of Billboard felt that West is the strongest performer on Hit-Boy's "club anthem" and observed the underlying samples from the film. In Spin, Rob Harvilla Jesal wrote that the song's stabs of synths "gracefully withstand" two goofy samples from the film and "a violent dubstep intrusion". David Amidon of PopMatters observed the song's West Coast "blog rap bop" and how it feels like the true start of the album from the position of track number three.

Some reviewers were less enthusiastic. For Urb, James Shahan felt that though West uses his signature punchline style in a humorous manner, Jay-Z's verse comes across as "one big laundry list" of his material possessions. Shahan found Jay-Z to be the main reason that the subjects of wealth and possessions become overwhelming, while he noted the "knocking kick drums and teasing synths". In a mixed review at RapReviews, Jesal 'Jay Soul' Padania assessed that the song is decent, yet a stronger one would be more suitable for its position as one of the album's first three tracks. Padania commented that the song functions suitably as "loud, obnoxious rap music" once listeners look past "the ringtone melody" and excessive bragging, considering "Niggas in Paris" a cringeworthy title and criticizing its heavy resemblance to fellow rapper Big Sean's Finally Famous (2011). Providing a negative review for Beats Per Minute, Sean Highkin wrote it off as sounding like a Waka Flocka Flame song with "30 seconds of dubstep stapled to the end".

"Niggas in Paris" peaked at number five on the 2012 US Billboard Hot 100 Christmas issue, becoming Jay-Z's 11th, West's 10th, and their third collaboration to reach the top five. The song also entered Nielsen SoundScan's 200 best-selling songs list and was one of three to use an asterisk to censor its title in November 2012. In June 2023, "Niggas in Paris" was certified diamond by the Recording Industry Association of America (RIAA) for pushing 10 million certified units in the US, becoming Jay-Z's first to receive the certification and West's second, following his 2007 single "Stronger".

== Accolades ==
The song was named as the 12th best track of 2011 by Pitchfork, whose author Ryan Dombal wrote that West's hah ad-lib successfully summarizes the "one-percent-ness of Watch the Throne" as he commended the lyrical style of him and Jay-Z. The track was voted fifth on The Village Voice's yearly Pazz & Jop poll, receiving 64 mentions. Rolling Stone named the song the second best single of 2011, with the staff praising the "minimalist thunder pegged to a tweedling synth line" and the lyrical opulence. XXL crowned "Niggas In Paris" as the best song of the year and the staff praised the direction of the bouncy production as Jay-Z and West "took balling to new frontiers", noting its club appeal too. For 2011, the magazine also listed the song as the "hottest beat".

Complex ranked the song as the 20th best of their decade, which spanned from when the magazine was founded in 2002 to its 10th anniversary in 2012. In 2014, NME ranked it as the best track of the 2010s decade so far and Emily Barker praised the "thundering tale of black empowerment" for Hit-Boy's production and Jay-Z's lyrics about Paris. That same year, Pitchfork placed the song at number 36 on their list and Kyle Kramer considered it "the crown jewel" of the opulence of Watch the Throne and the exception to the album's production due to the simplistic beat. In 2015, Billboard listed it as the fifth best song of the 2010s. In 2019, Business Insider ranked the track as the 35th best song of the decade and Stereogum named it as the 11th best; Tom Breihan highlighted the chemistry of Jay-Z flaunting his wealth and West boasting of his rap skills.

For the 2014 issue of XXL that celebrated 40 years of hip-hop, the track was listed as one of the five best singles of 2011. The song was chosen for the year of 2011 in The Rap Year Book, which deconstructed the most important rap song from every year since 1979 until 2015. NME named "Niggas in Paris" the 81st best song of all time in 2014. Highsnobiety placed "Niggas in Paris" at number 11 on their list of West's best songs in 2017, a year before Complex named the song as his sixth best. Also in 2018, Rolling Stone crowned the song as the 58th best of the 21st century so far and the staff praised its "over-the-top indulgence", as well as the hook that makes fun of haters and the "dark truth underlying the mayhem" of the lyrical content. On the 20th anniversary of BBC Radio 1Xtra in 2022, "Niggas in Paris" was voted by the station's listeners as the seventh best hip-hop track of the century. In 2023, Revolt named it as one of the 11 rap songs about high fashion to get dressed to and Legendary Lade noted "braggadocious rap at its highest form".

"Niggas in Paris" was awarded Best Rap Performance and Best Rap Song at the 2013 Grammy Awards, with the title's first word censored as "N*****" during the announcements. Hit Boy's work on the song marked his first Grammy wins and he felt a dream had been reached in not only winning the awards, but also sharing them with those he holds in such a high regard as Jay-Z and West. At a concert in December 2012, West cited the song not receiving a nomination for Record of the Year as one of his reasons for not attending the 2013 Grammys.

The song was nominated for Best Dancefloor Anthem at the 2013 NME Awards, alongside receiving a nomination for Anthem of the Summer at that year's UK Festival Awards. The song won Song of the Year at the 2011 Sucker Free Awards, while it was awarded as one of the Most Performed R&B/Hip-Hop Songs at the 2012 BMI R&B/Hip-Hop Awards. At the 2012 BET Hip Hop Awards, "Niggas in Paris" was awarded Track of the Year and Best Club Banger.

2011 year-end lists for "Niggas in Paris"
Publication	Accolade	Rank	Ref.
Amazon	The Best Songs of 2011	8	
Consequence	Top 50 Songs of 2011	13	
Digital Spy	25 Best Songs of 2011	24	
Pitchfork	The Top 100 Tracks of 2011	12	
Rolling Stone	Best Singles of 2011	2	
The Village Voice	The Pazz & Jop Singles Poll 2011	5	
XXL (magazine)	Top 100 Songs of 2011	1	

Decade-end lists for "Niggas in Paris"
Publication	Accolade	Rank	Ref.
Business Insider	The 113 Best Songs from the 2010s	35	
Billboard	The 20 Best Songs of the 2010s (2010–15)	5	
Consequence	Top 100 Songs of the 2010s	44	
Fact	The 100 Best Songs of the 2010s (2010–14)	64	
NME	The 50 Best Tracks Of The Decade (2010–14)	1	
Pitchfork	The 200 Best Tracks of the Decade (2010–14)	36	
Stereogum	The 200 Best Songs of the 2010s	2	
Way Too Indie	The 50 Best Songs of the Decade (2010–15)	13	
Uproxx	The Best Songs of the 2010s	80	

== Live performances ==
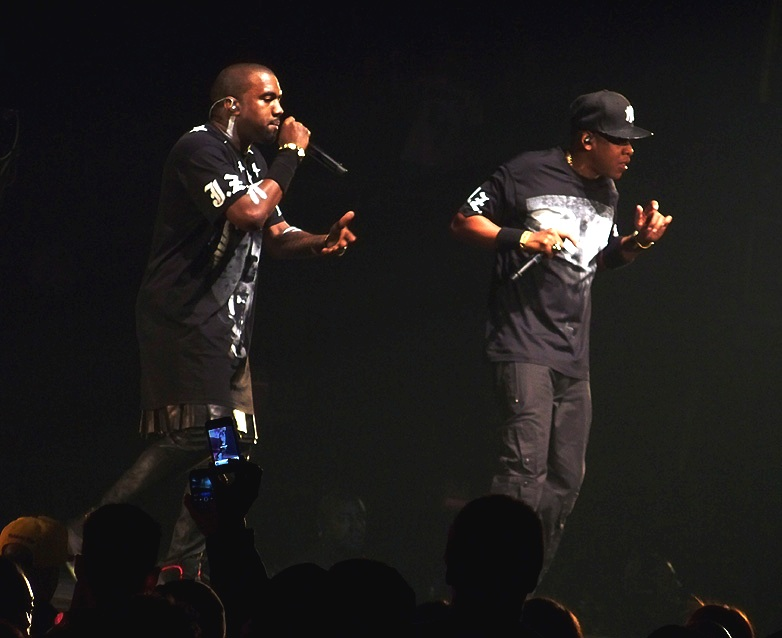
Jay-Z and West pictured during a concert at Los Angeles' Staples Center on the Watch the Throne Tour in December 2011, where they performed the song an increased number of 10 times from the 3 repeat performances at the tour's first concert.

During the first concert on the Watch the Throne Tour at Atlanta's Philips Arena on October 28, 2011, West commanded the audience as he performed the song with Jay-Z, "Bounce! Bounce!" Jay-Z ordered the performance to be restarted midway, with him and West performing "Niggas in Paris" three times at the concert. The rappers performed the song repeatedly during encores on the tour and increased the number of occasions as they traveled to different cities in the US, performing it 10 times for their third night at the Staples Center on December 13, 2011. During a concert at Rogers Arena in Vancouver for the Watch the Throne Tour on December 18, 2011, Jay-Z and West set their new record for the most performances of the song by performing it 11 times. The rappers then continuously delivered this amount of performances on the tour and for a show at Palais Omnisports de Paris-Bercy in Paris on June 18, 2012, they broke the record by performing the song 12 times. In November 2020, the musical director Omar Edwards recalled that an ending section of songs including Jay-Z's "Encore" (2003) was planned instead of the repeat performances, yet it was performed repeatedly after the reactions on one night and this led to the number of performances increasing further.

West brought out Jay-Z as a special guest to perform the song at the 2011 Victoria's Secret Fashion Show at Lexington Avenue Armory in New York City, where his wife Beyoncé was in attendance. During Jay-Z's encore at BBC Radio 1's Hackney Weekend on June 23, 2012, he was joined by West to perform the song. The rappers performed it three times, during which they instructed the audience to engage in circle pits. During the second day of Jay-Z's appearance at the 2012 Made in America Festival, he was joined by West to perform the song for the encore. The rappers performed it three times for an encore during Samsung Galaxy's South by Southwest concert at the Austin Music Hall in Austin, Texas on March 12, 2014, accompanied by a 12-foot video cube at the center of the stage. West performed the song as one of his opening numbers at the Glastonbury Festival 2015, walking around the stage while he twirled his microphone stand around. He delivered a performance of it from a flying stage at downtown Indianapolis' Gainbridge Fieldhouse for the Saint Pablo Tour's kickoff show on August 25, 2016. After Beyoncé and Jay-Z performed their 2003 duet "Crazy in Love" during stops on her Cowboy Carter Tour in Paris during June and Las Vegas during July 2025, he delivered a solo rendition of "Niggas in Paris" with altered lyrics to mention her.

== In popular culture ==
"Niggas in Paris" was used as the introductory music of the Miami Heat in the 2011–12 NBA season. In March 2012, Otter Spice Productions made their browser game Kanye Zone available for free that is soundtracked by repetition of West's line from the song, "Don't let me get in my zone." The game features West's head flying towards the zone in the center of the screen and the objective is to use keyboard buttons to prevent him from reaching there; Jay-Z and West appear if players lose with the line, "I'm definitely in my zone." In April 2012, then-French president François Hollande shared a campaign video for the year's presidential election that used the song. The video shows Hollande on a two-day trip around suburbs of Paris as he meets with the likes of his black, Arab, and multi-ethnic supporters.

After Jay-Z's friend Gwyneth Paltrow attended a concert in Paris on the Watch the Throne Tour in June 2012, she was criticized for a tweet from her as a white person reading, "Ni**as in paris for real." Paltrow responded that she simply tweeted the title of the song, yet she had identified artists at the concert as "niggas" before censoring the word in this tweet. On July 9, 2013, Miami Heat player LeBron James shared two short Instagram clips of him rapping over the song that he preceded by telling his followers "you already know what it is ..." Rapper French Montana sampled the song for the beginning of his Lil Wayne and Rick Ross-featuring single "Lose It", which was produced by West with the Mekanics and released on June 25, 2015.

== Remixes and cover versions ==
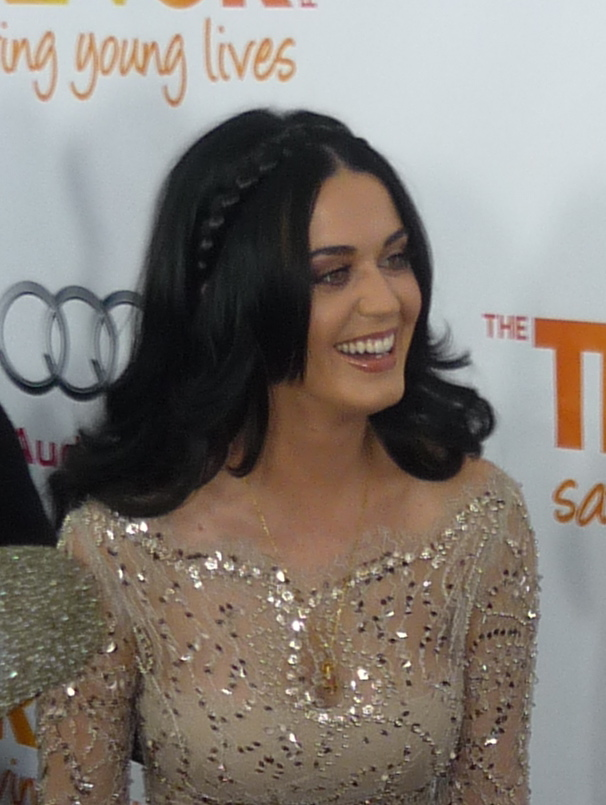
In March 2012, Katy Perry performed a clean cover version of the song on BBC Radio 1, which a couple of reviewers found to be off–putting.

On March 19, 2012, singer Katy Perry delivered an acoustic cover version of "Niggas in Paris" with a backing band for BBC Radio 1's Live Lounge special, censoring the explicit language. Katy Perry edited lines to phrases like "ninjas in London" and "that so cray", prefacing the performance by announcing it would become "real embarrassing" and she wore a New York Yankees cap as Jay-Z has done. Exclaim!'s Sarah Murphy described the performance as cringeworthy and embarrassing like the singer said, while Daniel Kreps of Spin felt that her cadence seems to make Kreayshawn sound like Nas and dubbed it "drunk karaoke rap". On May 29, 2012, the seven-man music collective cdza, an abbreviation of Collective Cadenza, shared their piano interpretation of the song entitled "Pianists in Paris". The interpretation features the members taking it in turns to add piano notes to the song and a music video was released, showing the collective playing the instrument.

On October 13, 2011, rapper T.I. announced that he had recorded a verse for the remix of "Niggas in Paris", but was unsure whether it would be official. Despite not speaking to West, T.I. had allowed him to listen to the verse and thought he let Jay-Z listen in turn, although lacked certainty if the remix would be official or unofficial. The remix was released the following day and features lyrics from T.I. in French, alongside him rapping that "Even in prison, I'm still the shit". On October 18, 2011, singer Chris Brown released a freestyle over the song that features ad-libs from T-Pain. The freestyle was met with a lukewarm response and the next day, an accompanying music video was released that sees Brown appearing with a werewolf masks and fangs. On January 16, 2012, rapper Mos Def, under his real name of Yasiin Bey, shared his version of the song titled "Niggas in Poorest" for his Top 40 Underdog series of remade radio hits and this coincided with Martin Luther King Jr. Day. The version includes menacing vocal effects and vocals from Bey that were described as a rant by Stereogum, discussing American culture such as the youth's pride and wickedness. Bey also addresses economic dread and poverty in the wake of the Great Recession, declaring that "Doctors say I'm the illest / I ain't got no insurance".

== Credits and personnel ==
Credits are adapted from the album's liner notes.

Recording

- Recorded at Le Meurice (Paris) and (The Mercer) Hotel (New York)
- Mixed at (The Mercer) Hotel (New York)

Personnel

- Kanye West – songwriter, production
- Jay-Z – songwriter
- Hit-Boy – songwriter, production
- Mike Dean – songwriter, production
- W.A. Donaldson – songwriter
- Anthony Kilhoffer – additional production, mix engineer
- Noah Goldstein – recording engineer

== Charts ==
=== Weekly charts ===
Chart performance for "Niggas in Paris"
Chart (2011–2014)	Peak position
Australia (ARIA)	66
Austria (Ö3 Austria Top 40)	38
Belgium (Ultratop 50 Flanders)	17
Belgium (Ultratop 50 Wallonia)	29
Canada Hot 100 (Billboard)	16
Denmark (Tracklisten)	19
France (SNEP)	28
Germany (GfK)	40
Hungary (Single Top 40)	26
Ireland (IRMA)	22
Mexico Ingles Airplay (Billboard)	32
Netherlands (Dutch Top 40)	37
Netherlands (Single Top 100)	28
New Zealand (Recorded Music NZ)	38
Scottish Singles Sales (Official Charts)	14
Slovakia Singles Digital (ČNS IFPI)	94
Sweden (Sverigetopplistan)	44
Switzerland (Schweizer Hitparade)	43
UK Singles (Official Charts)	10
UK Hip Hop/R&B (Official Charts)	3
US Billboard Hot 100	5
US Dance Airplay (Billboard)	15
US Hot R&B/Hip-Hop Songs (Billboard)	1
US Hot Rap Songs (Billboard)	1
US Pop Airplay (Billboard)	17
US Rhythmic Airplay (Billboard)	3

=== Year-end charts ===
2011 year-end chart performance for "Niggas in Paris"
Chart (2011)	Position
US Hot R&B/Hip-Hop Songs (Billboard)	46

2012 year-end chart performance for "Niggas in Paris"
Chart (2012)	Position
Australia Urban Singles (ARIA)	46
Belgium (Ultratop 50 Flanders)	41
Belgium (Ultratop 50 Wallonia)	78
Canada (Canadian Hot 100)	54
France (SNEP)	45
Netherlands (Single Top 100)	66
Sweden (Sverigetopplistan)	68
UK Singles (Official Charts Company)	31
US Billboard Hot 100	40
US Hot R&B/Hip-Hop Songs (Billboard)	11
US Hot Rap Songs (Billboard)	3
US Rhythmic (Billboard)	10

2013 year-end chart performance for "Niggas in Paris"
Chart (2013)	Position
Australia Urban Singles (ARIA)	37
France (SNEP)	196
UK Singles (Official Charts Company)	188

2015 year-end chart performance for "Niggas in Paris"
Chart (2015)	Position
Australia Urban Singles (ARIA)	50

2016 year-end chart performance for "Niggas in Paris"
Chart (2016)	Position
Australia Urban Singles (ARIA)	30

=== Decade-end charts ===
2010-19 decade-end chart performance for "Niggas in Paris"
Chart (2010–19)	Position
US Hot R&B/Hip-Hop Songs (Billboard)	36

== Certifications ==
Certifications and sales for "Niggas in Paris"
Region	Certification	Certified units/sales
Australia (ARIA)	2× Platinum	140,000^{‡}
Belgium (BRMA)	Gold	15,000^{*}
Canada (Music Canada)	Platinum	80,000^{*}
Denmark (IFPI Danmark)	3× Platinum	270,000^{‡}
Denmark (IFPI Danmark) Streaming	2× Platinum	3,600,000^{†}
Germany (BVMI)	2× Platinum	600,000^{‡}
Italy (FIMI)	Platinum	50,000^{‡}
New Zealand (RMNZ)	5× Platinum	150,000^{‡}
Sweden (GLF)	2× Platinum	80,000^{‡}
United Kingdom (BPI)	4× Platinum	2,400,000
United States (RIAA)	12× Platinum	12,000,000^{‡}
^{*} Sales figures based on certification alone.^{‡} Sales+streaming figures based on certification alone.^{†} Streaming-only figures based on certification alone.

== Release history ==
Release dates and formats for "Niggas in Paris"
Country	Date	Format	Label(s)	Ref.
United States	September 13, 2011	Rhythmic contemporary radio	Roc-A-Fella; Roc Nation; Def Jam	
United States	September 13, 2011	Urban contemporary radio	Roc-A-Fella; Roc Nation; Def Jam	
United States	November 8, 2011	Mainstream radio	Roc-A-Fella; Def Jam	
