= Ascender =

Ascender may refer to:

- Ascender (climbing), a rope-climbing device
- Ascender Corporation, a font company
- Ascender (typography), a font feature
- XP-55 Ascender, a prototype aircraft
- Isuzu Ascender, a sports utility vehicle
- JP Aerospace Ascender, a spaceship launch airship
- Pterodactyl Ascender, an ultralight aircraft

== See also ==
- JP Aerospace Orbital Ascender, an orbital airship design
- Ascend (disambiguation)
- Ascendancy (disambiguation)
