= Mt Xinu =

Software company founded in 1983

mt Xinu, Inc.
- Founded: July 28, 1983; 43 years ago
- Defunct: June 26, 1995
- Fate: dissolved
- Headquarters: Berkeley, California, United States

mt Xinu (from the letters in "Unix™", reversed) was a software company founded in 1983 that produced two operating systems. Its slogan "We know Unix™ backwards and forwards" is an allusion to the company's name and abilities.

mt Xinu offered several products:

- mt Xinu was a commercially licensed version of the BSD Unix operating system for the DEC VAX. The initial version was based on 4.1cBSD; later versions were based on 4.2 and 4.3BSD.
- more/BSD is mt Xinu's version of 4.3BSD-Tahoe for VAX and HP 9000, incorporating code from the University of Utah's HPBSD. It includes NFS.
- Mach386 is a hybrid of Mach 2.5/2.6 and 4.3BSD-Tahoe/Reno for 386 and 486-based IBM PC compatibles.

mt Xinu produced interoperability software for Macintosh and Unix, including an AppleShare server for Unix.

The company's principals were University of California, Berkeley computer science students and graduates, including Bob Kridle, Alan Tobey, Ed Gould, and Vance Vaughan. Debbie Scherrer was a later contributor.

mt Xinu made light-hearted Unix-themed calendars, including:

- Command of the Month (1987–1988)
- Lessons in Art (1989)
- Platform of the Year (1990)

A division of mt Xinu spawned Xinet, which was founded in 1991.
