= ACCENT Speakers Bureau =

American university student organization

- Formation: 1967; 59 years ago
- Type: Student government Speakers' bureau
- Headquarters: 306 J. Wayne Reitz Union, Gainesville, Florida, USA
- Chair: Nathan Feuerberg
- Parent organization: Student Government
- Affiliations: University of Florida
- Website: sg.ufl.edu/accent

ACCENT Speakers Bureau is the student government-run speakers' bureau of the University of Florida. It claims to be the largest student-run speakers' bureau in the United States. The organization is a student government agency.

ACCENT was created in 1967 and its speakers' series was created originally as a symposium, with the first featuring author Ralph Nader and then Vice President Richard Nixon as the headline speakers. The next year, the symposium featured a "liberal versus conservative" debate featuring Harry Goldin and James J. Kilpatrick. The symposium was accompanied by a politically charged magazine which featured writing from political science students and professors at the University of Florida. Over time, ACCENT broke away from the symposium format and turned into a year-long speaker series.

== Speakers ==
In any given year, the chair must stretch the budget to bring in speakers that the Student Body would like to hear speak. While most shows are sponsored solely by ACCENT, many other student organizations turn to ACCENT for different events. Organizations including, but not limited to, Black Student Union, Jewish Student Union, Hispanic Student Union, Asian American Student Union, Pride Student Union, Islam on Campus, and the Board of College Councils work with ACCENT to bring in speakers who are both relevant to their group and hold wide appeal.

=== Past speakers ===
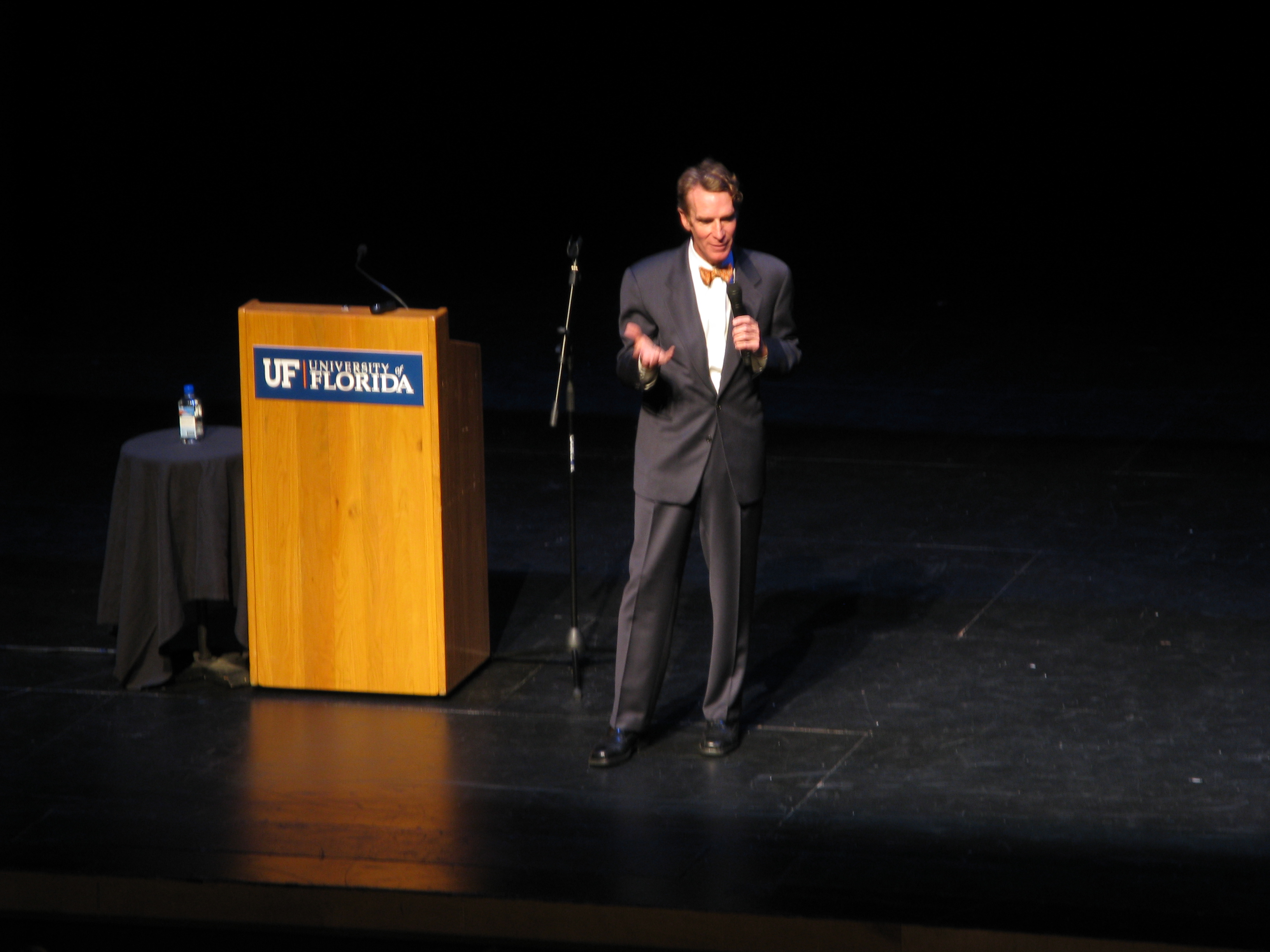
Bill Nye, host of Bill Nye the Science Guy, in November 2007

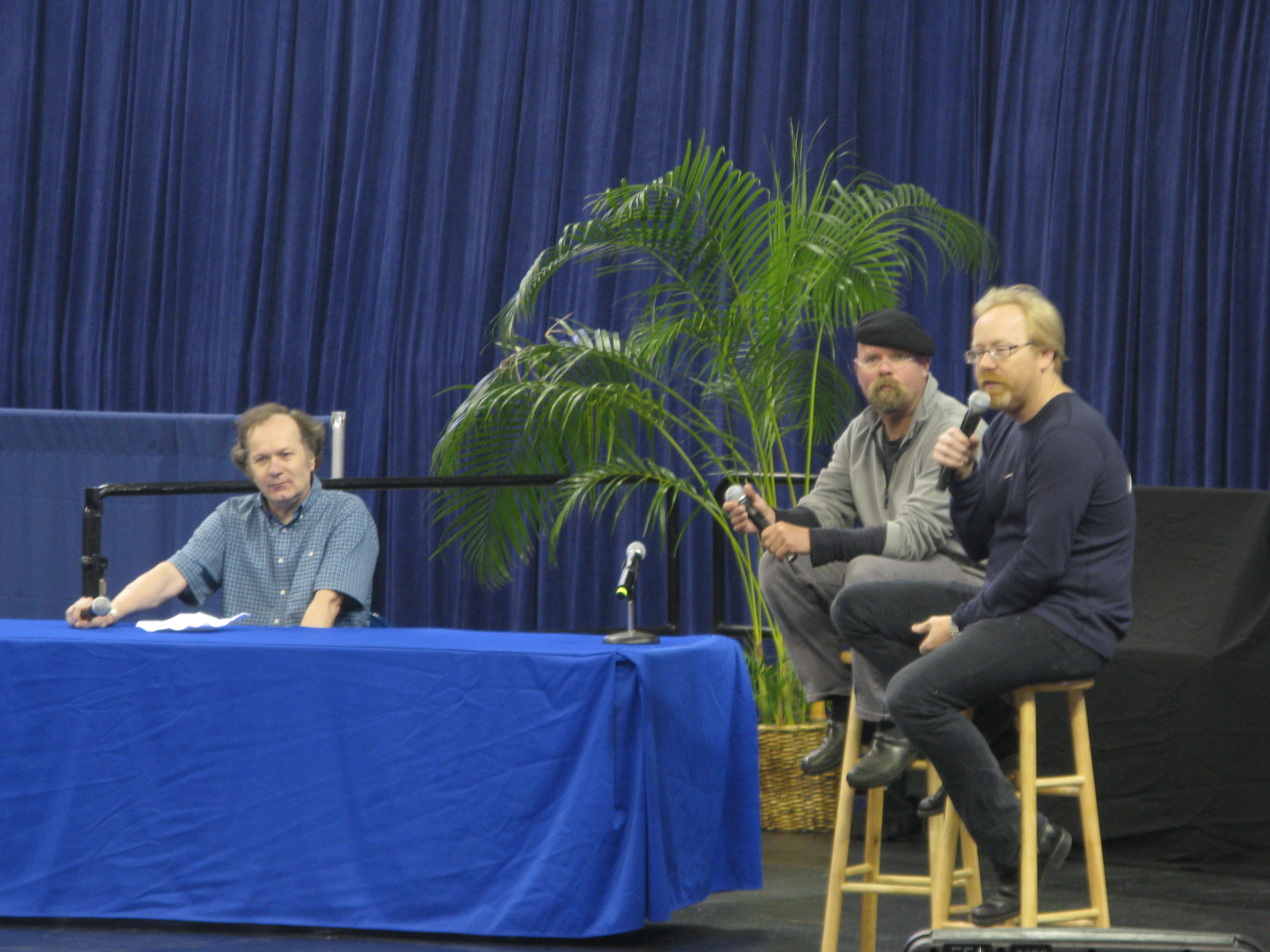
Jamie Hyneman and Adam Savage, together known as the MythBusters, speak in April 2008

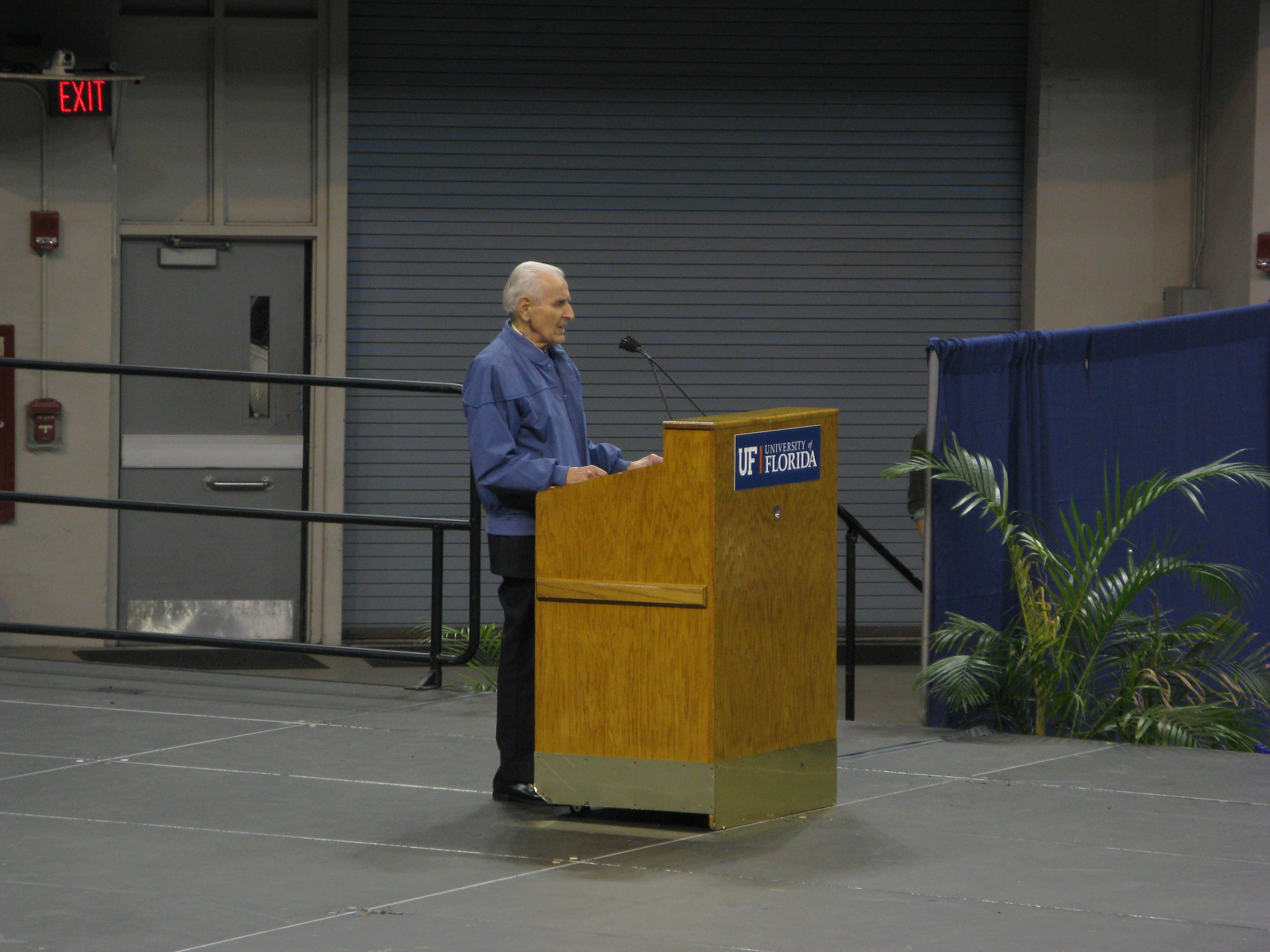
Assisted suicide advocate Jack Kevorkian speaks in January 2008 in his first public appearance since being released from prison

- Aaron Karo
- Adam Carolla
- Adam Sandler
- Adam Savage
- Afeni Shakur
- Alan Dershowitz
- Alberto Gonzales
- Andrew Card
- Andy Richter
- Andy Samberg
- Angela Davis
- Ann Coulter
- Anthony Rapp
- Ari Fleischer
- Ben Cohen
- Ben Shapiro
- Bill Clinton
- Bill Nye
- Blair Witch
- Bob Barr
- Bob Dole
- Bob Saget
- Bob Woodward
- Bobby Knight
- Brett Ratner
- Britt Lower
- Bryan Cranston
- Carl Hiaasen
- Chelsea Handler
- Chris Rock
- Christopher Reeve
- Cody Ko
- Coretta Scott King
- Dan Quayle
- Dan Senor
- Daniel Tosh
- Danny Coulson
- Danny Glover
- Dave Thomas
- David Dobrik
- Demetri Martin
- Dennis Kucinich
- Diablo Cody
- Dick Vitale
- Don King
- Don Shula
- Elie Wiesel
- Ellen DeGeneres
- Gary Hart
- Gene Simmons
- George Carlin
- George H. W. Bush
- George Pataki
- George Stephanopoulos
- Gerald Ford
- Greg Louganis
- Hasan Minhaj
- Helen Prejean
- Howard Zinn
- Jack Kevorkian
- Jaleel White
- James Franco
- Jamie Hyneman
- Jane Goodall
- Janet Reno
- Jasmine Guy
- Jeremy Piven
- Jerry Greenfield
- Jesse Jackson
- Jimmy Carter
- Jim Wright
- Joe Wilson
- Joel Siegel
- John Kerry
- John Singleton
- Jose Canseco
- Josh Malina
- Kenan Thompson
- Kerri Strug
- Ke Huy Quan
- Ken Jeong
- Kevin Nealon
- Kurt Vonnegut
- Kweisi Mfume
- Kyle Maynard
- Laurie David
- Lewis Black
- Liz Murray
- Lou Ferrigno
- Loveline
- Magic Johnson
- Marcia Clark
- Margaret Cho
- Martin Luther King III
- Matisyahu
- Max Weinberg
- Maya Angelou
- Marcello Hernandez
- Mia Farrow
- Michael Che
- Michael Moore
- Michael Smoak
- Michelle Kwan
- Mike Reiss
- Mikhail Gorbachev
- Mo Rocca
- Noam Chomsky
- Oliver North
- Oliver Stone
- Omar Al Issawi
- Pat Buchanan
- Patch Adams
- Paul Rudd
- Penn & Teller
- Queen Latifah
- Ralph Nader
- Ray McGovern
- Real World New Orleans Cast
- Richard Spencer
- Riki Wilchins
- Robert F. Kennedy, Jr.
- Ron Jeremy
- Ronald Takaki
- Ross Perot
- Roy Firestone
- Ruth Westheimer (Dr. Ruth)
- Sandra Bernhard
- Sarah Silverman
- Scott Kelly
- Seth Meyers
- Sheryl Crow
- Sheryl Swoopes
- Sinbad
- Spike Lee
- Steve Forbes
- Steve Wozniak
- The Amazing Kreskin
- Terry Crews
- Tom Green
- Tom Wolfe
- Trevor Noah
- Valerie Plame Wilson
- Vladimir Posner
- Wesley Clark
- William Shatner
- Yitzak Rabin
- Zach Braff

== Organizational information ==
ACCENT has the second-largest budget out of all the agencies, as well as the largest staff. Chapter 221 of the University of Florida Student Body Statutes outlines the general practices of the Speakers Bureau.

Over 50 student volunteers work with the chairman to bring speakers to the University of Florida. The chairman is required to appoint three vice chairs, but the remainder of the organizational structure is left up to the chairman. Vice chairships, directorships, and assistant directorships range from productions to promotions and every job in between. Applications are usually found on the official website at the beginning of each semester.

== Controversies ==
ACCENT Speakers Bureau has been scrutinized in recent years over the speakers they have brought to campus. In 2022, they announced Josh Richards as a speaker in Summer, but rescheduled his appearance for the Fall. Concerns were raised by students about Richards appearance on campus, as he had faced backlash in 2020 for flashing fans on a live, as reported by the Alligator.

In Spring 2024, ACCENT in partnership with Student Government Productions announced they would be bringing Nelly to perform. Nelly's sexual assault accusations were highlighted as potentially violating the Student Body Law prohibiting ACCENT and Student Government Productions from entering into contracts with organizations or individuals that have committed or have reasonably compelling evidence to believe they have committed an act of sexual violence. This resulted in the Student Senate pursuing a censure resolution against the ACCENT and Student Government Productions Heads, which the Student Senate approved on April 16, 2024.

The agency has also frequently been subject to allegations of capture by a single fraternity, the University of Florida chapter of Alpha Epsilon Pi. Public records have indicated that the majority of chairs of ACCENT have been from the fraternity. This has been part of larger allegations of domination by the campus group Florida Blue Key in student government.
