= PowerOpen Environment =

Open standard by AIM alliance

The PowerOpen Environment (POE), created in 1991 from the AIM alliance, is an open standard for running a Unix-based operating system on the PowerPC computer architecture.

== History ==
The AIM alliance was announced on October 2, 1991, yielding the historic first technology partnership between Apple and IBM. One of its many lofty goals was to somehow eventually merge Apple's user-friendly graphical interface and desktop applications market with IBM's highly scalable Unix server market, allowing the two companies to enter what Apple believed to be an emerging "general desktop open systems market". This was touched upon by Apple's November 1991 announcement of A/UX 3.0. The upcoming A/UX 4.0 (never actually released) would target the PowerOpen Environment ABI, merge features of IBM's AIX variant of Unix into A/UX, and use the OSF/1 kernel from the Open Software Foundation. A/UX 3.0 would serve as an "important migration path" to this new system, making Unix and System 7 applications compliant with PowerOpen. A/UX 4.0 and AIX were intended to run on a variety of IBM's POWER and PowerPC hardware, and on Apple's PowerPC based hardware.

PowerOpen will be the operating system for PowerPC Mac owners who need to run Unix-based applications. ... Apple agreed to provide IBM with the technology needed to allow standard Macintosh applications—starting with the Finder—to run under the new AIX, much as they do under A/UX today. Apple will apply the PowerOpen label to the new version of A/UX that results from the deal; IBM will do likewise with the new AIX.

— MacWEEK in 1993

The need for the POE reduced due to the increasing availability of Unix-like operating systems on PowerPC, such as Linux distributions and AIX. The PowerOpen Association was formed to promote the POE and test for conformance, and disbanded in 1995. That year, other AIM elements disbanded.

== Overview ==
The POE contains API and ABI specifications. The presence of the ABI specification in the POE distinguishes it from other open systems such as POSIX and XPG4, since it allows platform-independent binary compatibility, which is otherwise typically limited to particular hardware. Derived from AIX, the POE conforms to industry open standards including POSIX, XPG4, and Motif.

The POE is hardware bus independent. System implementations can range from laptop computers to supercomputers. It requires a multi-user, multitasking operating system. It provides networking support, an X Window System extension, a Macintosh Application Services extension, and Motif.

Macintosh Application Services (MAS) was an Apple software product intended to run existing Mac applications alongside other applications in the X environment, including those written for the 680x0 architecture. Also supporting Mac applications that had been ported to PowerPC, MAS was described as "Apple's key contribution to the PowerOpen alliance" and was demonstrated running Mac applications including a QuickTime movie on three different workstation platforms. It was an optional component in the PowerOpen architecture.

== See also ==
- PowerPC Reference Platform
