= The Accents =

- Genre: Doo-wop
- Years active: 1958
- Label: Brunswick
- Past members: Robert Draper Jr

The Accents was used as a band name by several different groups from 1956 through 1969. The most successful was a doo-wop band during the late 1950s. Its only popular song came out during the "sack" dress fad, and was entitled "Wiggle, Wiggle". The song was released in October 1958, and contended that a girl did not have to be pretty, or wear good clothes; she just had to wear a "sack" dress, and "wiggle" where it showed the most. It entered the Billboard Hot 100 at No. 96 on December 22, 1958 (for the week ending December 28, 1958) and remained on the charts for six more weeks, peaking at No. 51 on the chart ending January 25, 1959, and was off the charts by February 15, 1959.

Lead singer Robert Draper Jr died on Christmas day 1994.
