= MacMach =

Computer operating system

- Developer: Carnegie Mellon University
- OS family: Unix-like
- Working state: Discontinued
- Source model: Proprietary
- Initial release: 1991
- Marketing target: Researchers, hobbyists
- Supported platforms: Macintosh (68k SUN_workstation)
- Kernel type: Microkernel (Mach 3.0)
- Userland: 4.3BSD
- Default user interface: System 7
- License: BSD, Mach, AT&T UNIX
- Succeeded by: MkLinux

MacMach is a discontinued proof-of-concept operating system developed by Carnegie Mellon University (CMU). It natively booted the Mach 3.0 microkernel on Macintosh computers, then ran the Mac System 7 and Mac applications as a Mach user-level process. CMU had already invented Mach, which runs the rest of the operating system based on the 4.3BSD Unix personality as a user-space server rather than in the kernel, and MacMach simultaneously adds the System 7 personality. The system virtualizes the classic Mac OS, running System 7 as a contained Mach task to support standard Macintosh productivity software alongside Unix tools.

The Macintosh II workstations ran on the same network as the Andrew Project, but did not provide access to the Andrew_File_System and used the Macintosh System 7 windowing system, not the Andrew Window System nor X Window System. With a copy of the Macintosh II ROM stored in a file, MacMach could also run on 68020-based SUN_workstation.

== Overview ==
Mach decouples Unix from the kernel. MacMach boots the native Mach 3.0 microkernel, which runs 4.3BSD as one task and the entire Macintosh graphical environment and applications as another task. Mach's virtualization layer allows one computer and display to have BSD running the X Window System alongside unmodified Macintosh applications, such as Microsoft Excel and MacDraw. Support is limited to Motorola 68020 and Motorola 68030-based hardware with a paged memory management unit (PMMU), specifically select configurations of the Macintosh II, IIx, IIcx, IIci, IIfx, and SE/30.

CMU released the source code on CD-ROM in 1992 for approximately US$100 (equivalent to about $230 in 2025). Unlike the competing MachTen, which is a commercially supported product, MacMach is a research distribution with restrictive licensing. Because the system relies on the original 4.3BSD codebase, users are legally required to hold an AT&T UNIX System V source license. MacUser noted this restriction makes the system inaccessible to most general users.

At the time, Apple representatives indicated its experimental purposes and the unlikelihood of the company's commercial use of such an outside operating system.. However, after acquiring NeXT, Mac_OS_X_Server_1.0 and subsequent Apple operating systems did follow this pattern of the Mach as the core operating system and Macintosh windowing as separate processes.

MacMach was developed between 1989 and 1991 by one post-doc and a handful of students. The project wound down after the students graduated and after the original hypothesis was proven to work.

In April 1994, CMU posted this to Usenet:

The people responsible for this port have been gone from CMU for several years and so the code and the distribution procedure have succumbed to software rot. The distribution always required an AT&T source license, plus there were further restraints specified by Apple. As a result there was no way for us to pass the effort on to other parties.

— Mary Thompson

The core ideas were replicated but none of the code from MacMach was reused when Apple developed and released Mac_OS_X_Server_1.0 in 1999.
