= Omar Al Issawi =

Journalist, director, producer, and television personality

Omar al Issawi
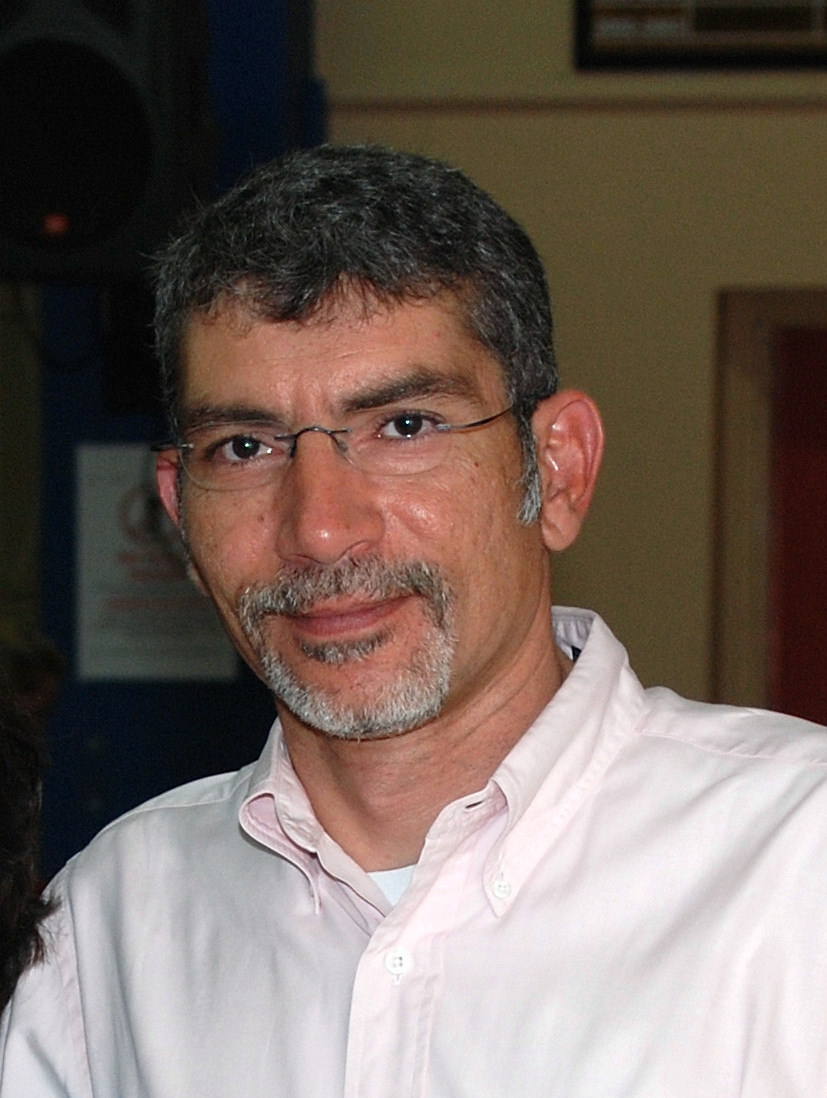
- Omar al Issawi
- Born: Omar al Issawi; June 4, 1967 (age 58)
- Occupations: Journalist, documentary director and producer, correspondent
- Website: www.issawi.net

Omar al-Issawi (Arabic: عمر العيساوي) (born June 4, 1967), is a journalist, director, producer, and television personality.

Between 1994 and 1996 al-Issawi was a reporter with the BBC Arabic World Service Television. On August 9, 1995 he was shot and wounded while on assignment for the BBC. The incident took place in Krajina during the Bosnian war.

In 1996 he was one of the original staff recruited for the launch of Al Jazeera.

His most notable documentaries are the landmark 15-part The War of Lebanon, the first of its kind produced by Al Jazeera. It was commercially available as a DVD set with English and French subtitles and the 2008/2009 production A Tale of Revolution, a 13-part chronicle of the history of the Palestine Liberation Organization.

A 6-part English-language version began airing on Al Jazeera English on July 13, 2009 under the title PLO: History of a Revolution. The final episode was broadcast on August 17, 2009. Al-Issawi penned a "making of" article to go with the program.

Al-Issawi was the subject of an article in the New Yorker magazine in April 2003. He was also featured in New York magazine, Newsweek as well as The Nation. He has also appeared on CNN and was a guest on the Larry King Show.

Al-Issawi has been an occasional analyst for Al Jazeera's English-language channel, commenting on Lebanese affairs, and has contributed to its website.

In 2009 The Guardian newspaper named al-Issawi as a "living national icon" of Lebanon.

In June 2011 he ended his 15-year association with Al Jazeera and Joined Human Rights Watch for several months as Director of Advocacy for the Middle East and North Africa region being based initially at the organization's New York headquarters.

Al-Issawi was a senior news editor at the website of the COP18/CMP8 UN Climate Change Conference held in Doha, Qatar in November and December, 2012.

In January 2013 he joined Sky News Arabia, based in Abu Dhabi, United Arab Emirates.

== Filmography (Director/Producer) ==
- Harb Loubnan (War of Lebanon, 2002, 15-part documentary)
- Hekayat Thawra (A Tale of Revolution: The History of the PLO, 2009, 13-part documentary)
- PLO: History of a Revolution (6-part English-language version of the Arabic PLO series)
