= Ascension of the Lord Cathedral, Târgu Mureș =

Cathedral in Targu Mures, Romania

Coordinates: 46°32′46″N 24°33′48″E

Ascension of the Lord Cathedral
- Catedrala Înălţarea Domnului
- View from Roses' Square

Religion
- Affiliation: Romanian Orthodox

Location
- Location: Târgu Mureș
- Country: Romania
- Interactive map of Ascension of the Lord Cathedral

Architecture
- Architect: Victor Vlad
- Completed: 1934

The Ascension of the Lord Cathedral (Romanian: Catedrala Înălţarea Domnului) is a Romanian Orthodox cathedral in Târgu Mureș, Romania. It was built between 1925 and 1934 on the initiative of Archpriest Ștefan Rusu. The cathedral was to replace a pre-existing 18th century wooden church on the site that had become too small for the parish. As the seat of an archpriest and not a bishop, it is a church and not technically a cathedral, but is commonly referred to as such.

The cathedral's cornerstone was laid on May 10, 1925, an event witnessed by, among others, the Minister of Religious Affairs, Alexandru Lapedatu, Bishop Nicolae Ivan, and Octavian Goga, who was a government minister at the time. The cathedral was built according to the plans of architect Victor Vlad of the Politehnica University of Timișoara, in the form of a Greek cross. The total cost of the building was over 17 million lei.

The building's construction was completed in 1934. The iconostasis was completed the same year by Traian Bobletec of Nazna, while the bells were cast at Timișoara. Due to lack of funding, murals of the interior were only completed in 1986.
