= StatView =

Statistics application

StatView is a statistics application originally released for Macintosh computers in 1985 by Abacus Concepts, Inc.. StatView was one of the first statistics applications to have a graphical user interface, capitalizing on the Macintosh's built-in GUI.

== Features ==
A user saw a spreadsheet of their data, comprising columns that could be integers, long integers, real numbers, strings, or categories, and rows that were usually cases (such as individual people for psychology data). Columns had informative headings; rows were numbered. Category data looked like strings (e.g., a column headed "sex" would have entries of "male" and "female", but these were coded by the application as integers). Category data were used to perform inferential statistical tests such as t-tests, ANOVAs, and chi-squared tests. To calculate statistics, a user clicked on particular column headings, designating them as an x value and one or more y values. Then the user used the application's menus to choose descriptive statistics or inferential statistics.

For example, a user's spreadsheet might contain columns for names of a participant in a survey (a string), sex (a category variable), IQ (integer), and years using a PC (real). By designating number of years using a PC as an x variable and IQ as a y variable, the user could then choose from a menu to perform a regression. The user then had to choose from another menu how to view the regression in a separate window, either as a table, in which case the regression equation and ANOVA were displayed, or as a scattergram, in which case a graph of the data and the regression line were shown. Contents of the analysis window could be copied either as text or as a PICT.

== Development ==
StatView was originally developed by Jim Gagnon and Dan Feldman of Abacus Concepts, Inc., a software development company based in Berkeley, California, in 1984. The two founded Abacus Concepts chiefly to market StatView. They signed a contract with software publisher BrainPower Inc. of Calabasas, California, in 1985 for the latter to distribute StatView.

Following the release of StatView 512+ (optimized for the Macintosh 512K) in 1986, Abacus broke from its agreement with BrainPower and began publishing updated versions of StatView on its own. Feldman alleged that BrainPower failed to properly market and support StatView to its customers, while BrainPower president Sherwin Steffin alleged that the split occurred due to a difference of opinion regarding StatView's feature set in newer versions. In 1988, Abacus introduced StatView SE+ Graphics. This version included ANOVA with one repeated-measure and, remarkably, a factor analysis. In print ads for StatView SE+ Graphics, Abacus explicitly discouraged readers from buying StatView 512+, which BrainPower continued to sell well after the release of SE+ Graphics, within the copy: "We wrote the award-winning StatView 512+ ... Please don't buy it". Following protracted legal battles, Abacus agreed to pay BrainPower back-royalties for every copy of SE+ Graphics sold.

In October 1989, BrainPower began advertising a replacement for StatView by the name of Statalyzer. This triggered Abacus to file an injunction against BrainPower, citing a breach of their original contract's non-compete clause. The Alameda County Superior Court issued a restraining order against BrainPower in January 1990, preventing the company from marketing StatView. In May 1990, BrainPower Inc. exited the software industry amid its lawsuit with Abacus.

In StatView 4, the user approach changed from clicking the to-be-analyzed data in the spreadsheet to clicking on column names in a separate window. This lack of immediacy was compensated for by an increase in the number of statistical tests that could be performed and in the power of existing tests. For example, multiway repeated-measures factors could be included in ANOVAs, with the only limit being the memory allocated to the application. There were ANCOVA and MANOVA too. StatView 4 also became available for PCs.

StatView was acquired by the SAS Institute in 1997. The final version released was StatView 5.0. The company discontinued it in favor of JMP.

A former StatView employee is sometimes able to rescue old data trapped in StatView formats and offers this service in exchange for charitable contributions to worthy causes.
