= Times Ascent =

- Type: Weekly Supplement published on Wednesdays
- Format: Broadsheet
- Owner: Bennett, Coleman & Co. Ltd.
- Publisher: Bennett, Coleman & Co Ltd.
- Editor: Dhaval Jaiswal
- Language: English
- Headquarters: Mumbai
- Website: Times Ascent

Times Ascent is a weekly supplement of The Times of India newspaper published on Wednesdays, that is focused on human resource development, employment and job opportunities. Times Ascent has 10 editions in Mumbai, Pune, Hyderabad, Lucknow, Ahmedabad, Chennai, Kolkata, Bangalore, Delhi and Nagpur.

== Content ==
The Times Ascent website was launched in January 2007. The website, is an extension of the print version. In the print version, the font of the headline is Myriad Roman, and that of the strapline and the main copy is Pointer OS Display Roman. The various sections of editorial content on the portal are as follows:

- ‘Gyan Gurus’ are regular columnists who are industry watchers and experts
- Thought Pool is a section written by student journalists
- Ask the Expert Questions are addressed to various experts on human resources and allied fields
- Live chat sessions are regularly scheduled on the website
- Books Section is where visitors can also recommend and read reviews of leading management books

Beyond the editorial content, the readers have access to research oriented content

- executive education options
- Corporate Social Responsibility activities of various organizations
- white papers

The editorial covers future and current trends, and news features, for job seekers and HR professionals. The features are about the changing paradigm of work, the personal fulfillment that the employee seeks, the emotional engagement the employer expects, and the empowerment for both.
