= Kanye Quest 3030 =

2013 video game

- Developer: Phenix
- Publisher: Phenix
- Engine: RPG Maker VX Ace
- Platform: Microsoft Windows
- Release: WW: July 22, 2013
- Genre: Role-playing
- Mode: Single-player

Kanye Quest 3030 is a role-playing video game developed and published by Phenix. released on July 22, 2013 for Windows. The game was unlicensed and unauthorised by musical artist Kanye West. It was created in RPG Maker VX Ace by artist Clara Hope under the username "Phenix". The game describes itself as a hip hop-themed science fiction 2D role-playing game.

== Plot and gameplay ==
In the year 2010, Kanye West takes out his garbage before tripping and falling into a portal, which brings him to the year 3030. The United States has become a dystopian society ruled by a clone of rapper Lil B claiming himself to be a god. A prophecy exists, claiming that Kanye West would return one day and overthrow Lil B. With this knowledge, Kanye West travels this dystopian society and teams up with other musicians such as MF Doom, 2Pac and RZA to fight to free America. Along the way they are challenged by other musicians such as Eminem, Nicki Minaj, De La Soul and LL Cool J. Upon completing the game, Kanye West gets sent back to 2010, where it is revealed that he dreamed the whole story after knocking himself out on the pavement after tripping over.

The gameplay is similar to the Pokémon series. Each rapper has their own special moves and abilities based on in-jokes within the rapping community. The player is challenged by different rappers wandering the streets and must defeat them to level up and progress in the game.

== Ascension Easter Egg ==
In 2015, a pastebin article revealed that if the player typed in the word "Ascend" into a dialogue box with an NPC, the player would be taken to a secret section of the game. In this secret section, the game would claim that the rest of the game's contents was a front for the area, and that the area was designed to "help teach you something beneficial". The section is full of terminals, and the player must enter a specific code into each one in order to complete the area. If the player goes backwards, they will enter a room with a QR code which has to be screen captured at multiple points in order to form the whole code. The website linked to the QR code had nothing but the name “Phoenix Gregory” placed on the screen in a Comic Sans font. After inputting all of the needed codes, the player would be teleported to a final terminal that would congratulate them on their ascension, and then prompt for another code. Upon entering the correct code and agreeing to participate further, the player would then be asked for their private information.

This was theorized by some to be connected to a group called Ascensionism that had become an urban legend around the same time as the game being released. Ascensionism has been described as a cult that believes in reincarnation and that was apparently hoping to recruit more members with Kanye Quest. They were rumored to have connections with record labels such as "Ascensionism Records", which was later revealed to be co-owned by Hope.

Another game would be connected to a group called Calypso in which the player completes tasks around a house while voicemails intended for the group played in the background. It is generally assumed these voicemails were taken directly off the hotline which was referenced in the original game. However, there was little else in terms of information about the Ascensionists in Calypso.

Until 2022, it was generally presumed that this was part of an abandoned alternate reality game, or ARG.

== Identity of creator ==
Until 2022, the creator of Kanye Quest 3030 was only known by the username "Phenix". In September and October 2022, Australian comedians Cameron James and Alexei Toliopoulos released a six-episode web series titled Finding Yeezus, which revealed that the creator of the game was Clara Hope, a musician and artist from Adelaide who made Kanye Quest 3030 as a high school project. She revealed the Ascensionism portion of the game was originally planned as a separate work before it was combined into Kanye Quest. She also revealed herself to be the creator of the pastebin article, which was an attempt to bring attention to the ARG's implementation within the game.
