= List of Apple operating systems =

The following is a list of operating systems released by Apple Inc. As of 2025, there are six supported software platforms: iOS, iPadOS, watchOS, tvOS, macOS and visionOS.

Prior to the introduction of the Macintosh in early 1984, Apple had several operating systems for the Apple II series, Apple SOS for the Apple III series, and Lisa OS and MacWorks XL for the Apple Lisa series; those were introduced between 1977 and 1983.

The original operating system for the Macintosh was the classic Mac OS, which was introduced in early 1984 as System Software. In 1997, System Software was renamed Mac OS.

In 1999, Mac OS X Server 1.0 was released, followed by Mac OS X 10.0, the first consumer release of the Mac OS X.

From the release of Mac OS X 10.0 until early 2007, Mac OS X was the only software platform. In early 2007, iPhone OS was introduced, increasing the number of software platforms by one, from one to two. In 2010, iPhone OS was renamed iOS. In 2011, Mac OS X was renamed OS X. In early 2015, the number of software platforms rose by one, from two to three, as watchOS was introduced. In late 2015, tvOS was introduced, increasing the number of software platforms again by one, from three to four. In 2016, OS X was renamed macOS. In 2019, iPadOS was introduced as the derived version of iOS for iPad, increasing the number of software platforms again by one, from four to five. In 2020, macOS received an increment in its version, from 10 to 11. In 2023, the number of software platforms rose again by one, from five to six, as visionOS was introduced.

== Apple computers ==
=== Apple II ===
- Apple DOS is the first operating system for Apple computers.
- Apple ProDOS
- Apple GS/OS

=== Apple III ===
- Apple SOS

=== Apple Lisa ===
- Lisa OS
- MacWorks XL

== Mac ==
=== Classic Mac OS ===
- System 1
- System 2
- System 3
- System 4
- System Software 5 – also marketed as System 5
- System Software 6 – also marketed as System 6
- System 7 – System 7.5.1 was the first to refer to itself as Mac OS, Mac OS 7.6 was the first to be branded as "Mac OS"
- Mac OS 8
- Mac OS 9 – Mac OS 9.2.2 was the last version of Classic Mac OS

=== Mac OS X / OS X / macOS ===
macOS was initially called Mac OS X and later OS X.

- Mac OS X Public Beta – code name Kodiak
- Mac OS X 10.0 – code name Cheetah
- Mac OS X 10.1 – code name Puma
- Mac OS X Jaguar – 10.2
- Mac OS X Panther – 10.3
- Mac OS X Tiger – 10.4
- Mac OS X Leopard – 10.5
- Mac OS X Snow Leopard – 10.6
- Mac OS X Lion – 10.7 – also marketed as OS X Lion
- OS X Mountain Lion – 10.8
- OS X Mavericks – 10.9 (free)
- OS X Yosemite – 10.10 (free)
- OS X El Capitan – 10.11 (free)
- macOS Sierra – 10.12 (free)
- macOS High Sierra – 10.13 (free)
- macOS Mojave – 10.14 (free)
- macOS Catalina – 10.15 (free)
- macOS Big Sur – 11 (free)
- macOS Monterey – 12 (free)
- macOS Ventura – 13 (free)
- macOS Sonoma – 14 (free)
- macOS Sequoia – 15 (free)
- macOS Tahoe – 26 (free)
- macOS Golden Gate – 27 (free)

==== macOS Server ====
macOS Server was initially called Mac OS X Server and later OS X Server.

- Mac OS X Server 1.0 – code name Hera, also referred to as Rhapsody
- Mac OS X Server 10.0 – code name Cheetah
- Mac OS X Server 10.1 – code name Puma
- Mac OS X Server 10.2 – code name Jaguar
- Mac OS X Server 10.3 – code name Panther
- Mac OS X Server 10.4 – code name Tiger
- Mac OS X Server 10.5 – also marketed as Leopard Server
- Mac OS X Server 10.6 – also marketed as Snow Leopard Server

Starting with Lion, there is no separate Mac OS X Server operating system. Instead the server components are a separate download from the Mac App Store.

- Mac OS X Lion Server – 10.7 – also marketed as OS X Lion Server
- OS X Mountain Lion Server – 10.8 – also marketed as Mountain Lion Server
- OS X Mavericks Server – 10.9 – also marketed as Mavericks Server
- OS X Yosemite Server – 10.10 – also marketed as Yosemite Server 4.0
- OS X 10.11 Server 5.0 – also marketed as OS X Server 5.0
- OS X 10.11 Server 5.1 – also marketed as OS X Server 5.1
- macOS 10.12 Server 5.2 – also marketed as macOS Server 5.2
- macOS 10.12 Server 5.3 – also marketed as macOS Server 5.3
- macOS 10.13 Server 5.4 – also marketed as macOS Server 5.4
- macOS 10.13 Server 5.5 – also marketed as macOS Server 5.5

==== Other macOS-related releases ====
- bridgeOS – powers the Touch Bar and other internal components
- NeXTSTEP
- OPENSTEP
- Darwin

=== Others ===
- A/ROSE
- A/UX
- AIX for Apple Network Servers
- Macintosh Application Environment
- MkLinux
- PowerOpen Environment
- Star Trek – unreleased
- Taligent – unreleased
- Copland – unreleased

== Mobile devices ==
=== Newton ===
- Newton OS

=== iPod ===
- iPod OS

=== iOS ===
iOS was previously known as iPhone OS, despite also being available on the iPod Touch (1st, 2nd, and 3rd generations) and the original iPad.

- iPhone OS 1 – derived from "Mac OS X" (now known as "macOS")
- iPhone OS 2
- iPhone OS 3
- iOS 4 – continued from iPhone OS 3
- iOS 5
- iOS 6
- iOS 7
- iOS 8
- iOS 9
- iOS 10
- iOS 11
- iOS 12
- iOS 13
- iOS 14
- iOS 15
- iOS 16
- iOS 17
- iOS 18
- iOS 26
- iOS 27

=== iPadOS ===
At its June 2019 Worldwide Developer Conference, Apple introduced iPadOS, a version of iOS, for iPad tablets, promised for fall 2019 release.

- iPadOS 13 – derived from iOS 13
- iPadOS 14 – derived from iOS 14
- iPadOS 15 – derived from iOS 15
- iPadOS 16 - derived from iOS 16
- iPadOS 17 - derived from iOS 17
- iPadOS 18 - derived from iOS 18
- iPadOS 26 - derived from iOS 26
- iPadOS 27 - derived from iOS 27

=== watchOS ===
- watchOS 1 – derived from iOS 8
- watchOS 2 – derived from iOS 9
- watchOS 3 – derived from iOS 10
- watchOS 4 – derived from iOS 11
- watchOS 5 – derived from iOS 12
- watchOS 6 – derived from iOS 13
- watchOS 7 – derived from iOS 14
- watchOS 8 – derived from iOS 15
- watchOS 9 – derived from iOS 16
- watchOS 10 – derived from iOS 17
- watchOS 11 – derived from iOS 18
- watchOS 26 – derived from iOS 26
- watchOS 27 – derived from iOS 27

== Living room ==
=== Apple TV Software ===
- Apple TV Software 1 – derived from Mac OS X 10.4 Tiger
- Apple TV Software 2 – derived from Mac OS X 10.4 Tiger
- Apple TV Software 3 – derived from Mac OS X 10.4 Tiger
- Apple TV Software 4 – derived from iOS 4 and iOS 5
- Apple TV Software 5 – derived from iOS 5 and iOS 6
- Apple TV Software 6 – derived from iOS 7
- Apple TV Software 7 – derived from iOS 8

There was no Apple TV Software 8; version 8 was skipped when moving to tvOS.

=== tvOS ===
- tvOS 9 – derived from iOS 9
- tvOS 10 – derived from iOS 10
- tvOS 11 – derived from iOS 11
- tvOS 12 – derived from iOS 12
- tvOS 13 – derived from iOS 13
- tvOS 14 – derived from iOS 14
- tvOS 15 – derived from iOS 15
- tvOS 16 – derived from iOS 16
- tvOS 17 – derived from iOS 17
- tvOS 18 – derived from iOS 18
- tvOS 26 – derived from iOS 26
- tvOS 27 – derived from iOS 27

=== audioOS ===
Also known as "HomePod Software".

- audioOS 11 (iOS 11) – derived and marketed as part of iOS 11
- audioOS 12 (iOS 12) – derived and marketed as part of iOS 12
- audioOS 13 – derived and marketed as part of iOS 13 for versions until audioOS 13.4 and derived from tvOS 13 and marketed as a standalone minor operating system for versions after audioOS 13.4.
- audioOS 14 – derived from tvOS 14
- audioOS 15 – derived from tvOS 15
- audioOS 16 – derived from tvOS 16
- audioOS 17 – derived from tvOS 17
- audioOS 18 – derived from tvOS 18
- audioOS 26 – derived from tvOS 26
- audioOS 27 – derived from tvOS 27

=== visionOS ===
- visionOS 1 – derived from iOS 17
- visionOS 2 – derived from iOS 18
- visionOS 26 – derived from iOS 26
- visionOS 27 – derived from iOS 27

=== HomeView Software ===
- HomeView Software 26.5 – derived (possibly) from tvOS, iOS, or iPadOS 26.5
- HomeView Software 27.2 – derived (possibly) from tvOS, iOS, or iPadOS 27.2

== Table of operating systems ==
| Device(s) | OS | Release | Announced | Released | Discontinued | Notes |
|---|---|---|---|---|---|---|
| Apple II | Apple DOS | | June 1978 | | 1983 | |
| Apple II | Apple ProDOS | | 1983 | | 1993 | |
| Apple II | Apple GS/OS | | 1988 | | | |
| Apple III | Apple SOS | | 1980 | | | |
| Apple Lisa | Lisa OS | | 1983 | | | |
| Apple Lisa | MacWorks XL | | 1984 | | | |
| Macintosh computers (68k) | Classic Mac OS | System 1 | 1984 | | | |
| Macintosh computers (68k) | Classic Mac OS | System 2 | 1985 | | | |
| Macintosh computers (68k) | Classic Mac OS | System 3 | 1986 | | | |
| Macintosh computers (68k) | Classic Mac OS | System 4 | 1987 | | | |
| Macintosh computers (68k) | Classic Mac OS | System Software 5 | 1987 | | | Also marketed as System 5 |
| Macintosh computers (68k) | Classic Mac OS | System Software 6 | 1988 | | | Also marketed as System 6 |
| Macintosh computers (68k and PowerPC) | Classic Mac OS | System 7 | 1991 | | | System 7.5.1 was the first to refer to itself as Mac OS; Mac OS 7.6 was the first to be branded as "Mac OS" |
| Macintosh computers (68k and PowerPC) | Classic Mac OS | Mac OS 8 | 1997 | | | |
| Macintosh computers (PowerPC) | Classic Mac OS | Mac OS 9 | 1999 | | | |
| Macintosh computers (PowerPC) | Mac OS X/OS X/macOS | Mac OS X Public Beta | September 13, 2000 | | May 14, 2001 | Code name Kodiak |
| Macintosh computers (PowerPC) | Mac OS X/OS X/macOS | Mac OS X 10.0 | September 13, 2000 | March 24, 2001 | | Code name Cheetah |
| Macintosh computers (PowerPC) | Mac OS X/OS X/macOS | Mac OS X 10.1 | September 25, 2001 | | | Code name Puma |
| Macintosh computers (PowerPC) | Mac OS X/OS X/macOS | Mac OS X Jaguar | | August 23, 2002 | | Version 10.2; First release with a marketing name |
| Macintosh computers (PowerPC) | Mac OS X/OS X/macOS | Mac OS X Panther | | October 24, 2003 | | Version 10.3 |
| Macintosh computers (PowerPC and x86) | Mac OS X/OS X/macOS | Mac OS X Tiger | | April 29, 2005 | | Version 10.4 |
| Macintosh computers (PowerPC and x86) | Mac OS X/OS X/macOS | Mac OS X Leopard | | October 26, 2007 | | Version 10.5 |
| Macintosh computers (x86) | Mac OS X/OS X/macOS | Mac OS X Snow Leopard | | August 28, 2009 | | Version 10.6 |
| Macintosh computers (x86) | Mac OS X/OS X/macOS | Mac OS X Lion | | July 20, 2011 | | Version 10.7; Also marketed as OS X Lion |
| Macintosh computers (x86) | Mac OS X/OS X/macOS | OS X Mountain Lion | June 11, 2012 | July 25, 2012 | | Version 10.8 |
| Macintosh computers (x86) | Mac OS X/OS X/macOS | OS X Mavericks | June 10, 2013 | October 22, 2013 | | Version 10.9 |
| Macintosh computers (x86) | Mac OS X/OS X/macOS | OS X Yosemite | June 2, 2014 | October 16, 2014 | | Version 10.10 |
| Macintosh computers (x86) | Mac OS X/OS X/macOS | OS X El Capitan | June 8, 2015 | September 30, 2015 | | Version 10.11 |
| Macintosh computers (x86) | Mac OS X/OS X/macOS | macOS Sierra | June 13, 2016 | September 20, 2016 | | Version 10.12 |
| Macintosh computers (x86) | Mac OS X/OS X/macOS | macOS High Sierra | June 5, 2017 | September 25, 2017 | | Version 10.13 |
| Macintosh computers (x86) | Mac OS X/OS X/macOS | macOS Mojave | June 4, 2018 | September 24, 2018 | | Version 10.14; Final version of macOS to support 32-bit hardware and software |
| Macintosh computers (x86) | Mac OS X/OS X/macOS | macOS Catalina | June 3, 2019 | October 7, 2019 | | Version 10.15; First version of macOS with only 64-bit hardware and software support; 32-bit hardware and software support dropped |
| Macintosh computers (x86 and ARM64) | Mac OS X/OS X/macOS | macOS Big Sur | June 22, 2020 | November 12, 2020 | | Version 11 |
| Macintosh computers (x86 and ARM64) | Mac OS X/OS X/macOS | macOS Monterey | June 7, 2021 | October 25, 2021 | | Version 12 |
| Macintosh computers (x86 and ARM64) | Mac OS X/OS X/macOS | macOS Ventura | June 6, 2022 | October 24, 2022 | | Version 13 |
| Macintosh computers (x86 and ARM64) | Mac OS X/OS X/macOS | macOS Sonoma | June 5, 2023 | September 26, 2023 | | Version 14 |
| Macintosh computers (x86 and ARM64) | Mac OS X/OS X/macOS | macOS Sequoia | June 10, 2024 | | | Version 15 |
| Macintosh computers (PowerPC) | Mac OS X Server | Mac OS X Server 1.0 | March 16, 1999 | March 16, 1999 | | Code name Hera; Also referred to as Rhapsody |
| Macintosh computers (PowerPC) | Mac OS X Server | Mac OS X Server 10.0 | | May 21, 2001 | | Code name Cheetah |
| Macintosh computers (PowerPC) | Mac OS X Server | Mac OS X Server 10.1 | | September 25, 2001 | | Code name Puma |
| Macintosh computers (PowerPC) | Mac OS X Server | Mac OS X Server 10.2 | | August 23, 2002 | | Code name Jaguar |
| Macintosh computers (PowerPC) | Mac OS X Server | Mac OS X Server 10.3 | | October 24, 2003 | | Code name Panther |
| Macintosh computers (PowerPC and x86) | Mac OS X Server | Mac OS X Server 10.4 | | April 29, 2005 | | Code name Tiger |
| Macintosh computers (PowerPC and x86) | Mac OS X Server | Mac OS X Server 10.5 | | October 26, 2007 | Also marketed as Leopard Server | |
| Macintosh computers (68k) | A/UX | | | February 1988 | | |
| Macintosh computers (PowerPC) | MkLinux | | | | | |
| Macintosh computers (PowerPC) | Copland | | N/A | | | Never released |
| Other computers | NeXTSTEP | | September 18, 1989 | | | Developed by NeXT, which Apple bought in 1997 |
| Other computers | OpenStep | | 1994 | | | Developed by NeXT, which Apple bought in 1997 |
| Other computers | Darwin | | November 15, 2000 | | | |
| Other computers | A/ROSE | | | | | |
| Other computers | AIX for Apple Network Servers | | | | | |
| Other computers | Macintosh Application Environment | | | | | |
| Other computers | PowerOpen Environment | | | | | |
| Other computers | Star Trek | | N/A | | | Never released |
| Other computers | Taligent | | N/A | | | Never released |
| Newton | Newton OS | | | August 3, 1993 | February 27, 1998 | |
| iPod | iPod OS | | | | | See also iPod firmware |
| Apple TV | Apple TV Software (x86) | Apple TV Software 1 | September 12, 2006 | March 21, 2007 | February 12, 2008 | Derived from Mac OS X 10.4 Tiger; Used an updated Front Row interface |
| Apple TV | Apple TV Software (x86) | Apple TV Software 2 | January 15, 2008 | February 12, 2008 | October 2009 | Derived from Mac OS X 10.4 Tiger; Also marketed as Apple TV Take Two; Removed Front Row |
| Apple TV | Apple TV Software (x86) | Apple TV Software 3 | | October 2009 | | Derived from Mac OS X 10.4 Tiger |
| Apple TV | Apple TV Software (ARM) | Apple TV Software 4 | | September 1, 2010 | | Derived from iOS 4 and iOS 5 |
| Apple TV | Apple TV Software (ARM) | Apple TV Software 5 | | March 7, 2012 | | Derived from iOS 5 and iOS 6 |
| Apple TV | Apple TV Software (ARM) | Apple TV Software 6 | | September 20, 2013 | | Derived from iOS 7 |
| Apple TV | Apple TV Software (ARM) | Apple TV Software 7 (Note: There was no Apple TV Software 8 or tvOS 8, version 8 was skipped when moving to tvOS.) | | September 17, 2014 | | Derived from iOS 8 |
| Apple TV | tvOS | tvOS 9 | September 9, 2015 | October 30, 2015 | | Derived from iOS 9; First version of tvOS |
| Apple TV | tvOS | tvOS 10 | June 13, 2016 | September 13, 2016 | | Derived from iOS 10; Second version of tvOS |
| Apple TV | tvOS | tvOS 11 | June 5, 2017 | September 19, 2017 | | Derived from iOS 11; Third version of tvOS |
| Apple TV | tvOS | tvOS 12 | June 4, 2018 | September 17, 2018 | | Derived from iOS 12; Fourth version of tvOS |
| Apple TV | tvOS | tvOS 13 | June 3, 2019 | September 19, 2019 | | Derived from iOS 13; Fifth version of tvOS |
| Apple TV | tvOS | tvOS 14 | June 22, 2020 | September 16, 2020 | | Derived from iOS 14; Sixth version of tvOS |
| Apple TV | tvOS | tvOS 15 | June 7, 2021 | September 20, 2021 | | Derived from iOS 15; Seventh version of tvOS |
| Apple TV | tvOS | tvOS 16 | June 6, 2022 | September 12, 2022 | | Derived from iOS 16; Eighth version of tvOS |
| Apple TV | tvOS | tvOS 17 | June 5, 2023 | September 18, 2023 | | Derived from iOS 17; Ninth version of tvOS |
| Apple TV | tvOS | tvOS 18 | June 10, 2024 | | | Derived from iOS 18; Tenth version of tvOS |
| iOS devices (iPhone, iPod Touch, and iPad) | iPhone OS/iOS (Note: iOS was previously known as iPhone OS, despite also being available on the iPod Touch (1st, 2nd, and 3rd generations) and the original iPad.) | iPhone OS 1 | January 2007 | June 29, 2007 | | Derived from "OS X" (At the time, "macOS" was still known as "Mac OS X" and not "OS X" as it was known from 2012 to 2016.) |
| iOS devices (iPhone, iPod Touch, and iPad) | iPhone OS/iOS | iPhone OS 2 | Early 2008 | June 2008 | | |
| iOS devices (iPhone, iPod Touch, and iPad) | iPhone OS/iOS | iPhone OS 3 | Early 2009 | June 2009 | | |
| iOS devices (iPhone, iPod Touch, and iPad) | iPhone OS/iOS | iOS 4 | Early 2010 | June 2010 | | Continuing from iPhone OS 3 |
| iOS devices (iPhone, iPod Touch, and iPad) | iPhone OS/iOS | iOS 5 | June 6, 2011 | October 12, 2011 | | |
| iOS devices (iPhone, iPod Touch, and iPad) | iPhone OS/iOS | iOS 6 | June 11, 2012 | September 19, 2012 | | |
| iOS devices (iPhone, iPod Touch, and iPad) | iPhone OS/iOS | iOS 7 | June 10, 2013 | September 18, 2013 | | First version of iOS to bring 64-bit hardware and software support |
| iOS devices (iPhone, iPod Touch, and iPad) | iPhone OS/iOS | iOS 8 | June 2, 2014 | September 17, 2014 | | |
| iOS devices (iPhone, iPod Touch, and iPad) | iPhone OS/iOS | iOS 9 | June 8, 2015 | September 16, 2015 | | |
| iOS devices (iPhone, iPod Touch, and iPad) | iPhone OS/iOS | iOS 10 | June 13, 2016 | September 13, 2016 | | Final version of iOS to support 32-bit hardware and software |
| iOS devices (iPhone, iPod Touch, and iPad) | iPhone OS/iOS | iOS 11 | June 5, 2017 | September 19, 2017 | | First version of iOS with only 64-bit hardware and software support; 32-bit hardware and software support dropped |
| iOS devices (iPhone, iPod Touch, and iPad) | iPhone OS/iOS | iOS 12 | June 4, 2018 | September 17, 2018 | | |
| iOS devices (iPhone and iPod Touch) | iPhone OS/iOS | iOS 13 | June 3, 2019 | September 19, 2019 | | |
| iOS devices (iPhone and iPod Touch) | iPhone OS/iOS | iOS 14 | June 22, 2020 | September 16, 2020 | | |
| iOS devices (iPhone and iPod Touch) | iPhone OS/iOS | iOS 15 | June 7, 2021 | September 20, 2021 | | Final version of iOS supported on or by iPod touch |
| iPhone | iPhone OS/iOS | iOS 16 | June 6, 2022 | September 12, 2022 | | First version of iOS supported only on iPhone; support dropped for iPod touch |
| iPhone | iPhone OS/iOS | iOS 17 | June 5, 2023 | September 18, 2023 | | |
| iPhone | iPhone OS/iOS | iOS 18 | June 10, 2024 | | | |
| iPad | iPadOS (derived from iOS) | iPadOS 13 | June 3, 2019 | September 24, 2019 | | Derived from iOS 13; First version of iPadOS |
| iPad | iPadOS (derived from iOS) | iPadOS 14 | June 22, 2020 | September 16, 2020 | | Derived from iOS 14; Second version of iPadOS |
| iPad | iPadOS (derived from iOS) | iPadOS 15 | June 7, 2021 | September 20, 2021 | | Derived from iOS 15; Third version of iPadOS |
| iPad | iPadOS (derived from iOS) | iPadOS 16 | June 6, 2022 | October 24, 2022 | | Derived from iOS 16; Fourth version of iPadOS |
| iPad | iPadOS (derived from iOS) | iPadOS 17 | June 5, 2023 | September 18, 2023 | | Derived from iOS 17; Fifth version of iPadOS |
| iPad | iPadOS (derived from iOS) | iPadOS 18 | June 10, 2024 | | | Derived from iOS 18; Sixth version of iPadOS |
| Apple Watch | watchOS | watchOS 1 | Early 2015 | April 24, 2015 | | Derived from iOS 8; First version of watchOS |
| Apple Watch | watchOS | watchOS 2 | June 8, 2015 | September 21, 2015 | | Derived from iOS 9; Second version of watchOS |
| Apple Watch | watchOS | watchOS 3 | June 13, 2016 | September 13, 2016 | | Derived from iOS 10; Third version of watchOS |
| Apple Watch | watchOS | watchOS 4 | June 5, 2017 | September 19, 2017 | | Derived from iOS 11; Fourth version of watchOS |
| Apple Watch | watchOS | watchOS 5 | June 4, 2018 | September 17, 2018 | | Derived from iOS 12; Fifth version of watchOS; First version of watchOS to bring 64-bit hardware and software support |
| Apple Watch | watchOS | watchOS 6 | June 3, 2019 | September 19, 2019 | | Sixth version of watchOS; Derived from iOS 13 |
| Apple Watch | watchOS | watchOS 7 | June 22, 2020 | September 16, 2020 | | Seventh version of watchOS; Derived from iOS 14 |
| Apple Watch | watchOS | watchOS 8 | June 7, 2021 | September 20, 2021 | | Derived from iOS 15; Eighth version of watchOS; Final version of watchOS to support 32-bit hardware and software |
| Apple Watch | watchOS | watchOS 9 | June 6, 2022 | September 12, 2022 | | Derived from iOS 16; Ninth version of watchOS; First version of watchOS with only 64-bit hardware and software support; 32-bit hardware and software support dropped |
| Apple Watch | watchOS | watchOS 10 | June 5, 2023 | September 18, 2023 | | Derived from iOS 17; Tenth version of watchOS |
| Apple Watch | watchOS | watchOS 11 | June 10, 2024 | | | Derived from iOS 18; Eleventh version of watchOS |
| Vision Pro | visionOS | visionOS 1 | June 5, 2023 | January 31, 2024; February 2, 2024, with the release of Apple Vision Pro | | |
| Vision Pro | visionOS | visionOS 2 | June 10, 2024 | | | |
