= Mac operating systems =

Series of Macintosh operating systems

Mac operating systems have been developed by Apple in a succession of two major series.

In 1984, Apple debuted the operating system that is now known as the classic Mac OS with its release of the original Macintosh System Software. The system, rebranded Mac OS in 1997, was pre-installed on every Macintosh until 2002 and offered on Macintosh clones shortly in the 1990s. It was noted for its ease of use, and also criticized for its lack of modern technologies compared to its competitors.

The current Mac operating system is macOS, originally named Mac OS X until 2012 and then OS X until 2016. It was developed between 1997 and 2001 after Apple's purchase of NeXT. It brought an entirely new architecture based on NeXTSTEP, a Unix system, that eliminated many of the technical challenges that the classic Mac OS faced, such as problems with memory management. The current macOS is pre-installed with every Mac and receives a major update annually. It is the basis of Apple's current system software for its other devices – iOS, iPadOS, watchOS, and tvOS.

Prior to the introduction of Mac OS X, Apple experimented with several other concepts, releasing different products designed to bring the Macintosh interface or applications to Unix-like systems or vice versa, A/UX, MAE, and MkLinux. Apple's effort to expand upon and develop a replacement for its classic Mac OS in the 1990s led to a few cancelled projects, code named Star Trek, Taligent, and Copland.

Although the classic Mac OS and macOS (Mac OS X) have different architectures, they share a common set of GUI principles, including a menu bar across the top of the screen; the Finder shell, featuring a desktop metaphor that represents files and applications using icons and relates concepts like directories and file deletion to real-world objects like folders and a trash can; and overlapping windows for multitasking.

Before the arrival of the Macintosh in 1984, Apple's history of operating systems began with its Apple II computers in 1977, which run Apple DOS, ProDOS, and GS/OS; the Apple III in 1980 runs Apple SOS; and the Lisa in 1983 which runs Lisa OS and later MacWorks XL, a Macintosh emulator. Apple developed the Newton OS for its Newton personal digital assistant from 1993 to 1997.

Apple launched several new operating systems based on the core of macOS: iOS in 2007 for its iPhone, iPad, and iPod Touch mobile devices, and in 2017 for its HomePod smart speakers; watchOS in 2015 for the Apple Watch; tvOS in 2015 for the Apple TV set-top box; and visionOS in 2024 for the Apple Vision Pro mixed reality headset.

== Classic Mac OS ==
The classic Mac OS is the original Macintosh operating system introduced in 1984 alongside the first Macintosh and remained in primary use on Macs until Mac OS X in 2001.

Apple released the original Macintosh on January 24, 1984; its early system software is partially based on Lisa OS, and inspired by the Alto computer, which former Apple CEO Steve Jobs previewed at Xerox PARC. It was originally named "System Software", or simply "System"; Apple rebranded it as "Mac OS" in 1996 due in part to its Macintosh clone program that ended one year later.

Classic Mac OS is characterized by its monolithic design. Initial versions of the System Software run one application at a time. System 5 introduced cooperative multitasking. System 7 supports 32-bit memory addressing and virtual memory, allowing larger programs. Later updates to the System 7 enable the transition to the PowerPC architecture. The system was considered user-friendly, but its architectural limitations were critiqued, such as limited memory management, lack of protected memory and access controls, and susceptibility to conflicts among extensions.

=== Releases ===
This text-only logo for classic Mac OS started with Mac OS 7.6, released in 1997.

Nine major versions of the classic Mac OS were released. The name "Classic" that now signifies the system as a whole is a reference to a compatibility layer that helped ease the transition to Mac OS X.

- Macintosh System Software – "System 1", released in 1984
- System Software 2, 3, and 4 – released between 1985 and 1987
- System Software 5 – released in 1987
- System Software 6 – released in 1988
- System 7 / Mac OS 7.6 – released in 1991
- Mac OS 8 – released in 1997
- Mac OS 9 – final major version, released in 1999

== Mac OS X, OS X, and macOS ==
The system was launched as Mac OS X, renamed OS X from 2012 to 2016, and then renamed macOS as the current Mac operating system that officially succeeded the classic Mac OS in 2001.

The system was originally marketed as simply "version 10" of Mac OS, but it has a history that is largely independent of the classic Mac OS. It is a Unix-based operating system built on NeXTSTEP and other NeXT technology from the late 1980s until early 1997, when Apple purchased the company and its CEO, Steve Jobs, returned to Apple. Precursors to Mac OS X include OPENSTEP and Apple's Rhapsody project.

macOS is based on Apple's open source Darwin operating system, which is based on the XNU kernel and BSD.

macOS is the basis for some of Apple's other operating systems, including iPhone OS/iOS, iPadOS, watchOS, tvOS, and visionOS.

=== Releases ===
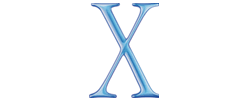
The "X" logo for Mac OS X versions 10.0 "Cheetah" and 10.1 "Puma", released in 2001

==== Desktop ====
After a public beta was released in 2000, the first major version of the system was released on March 24, 2001, supporting the Aqua user interface. Since then, several more versions adding newer features and technologies have been released. Since 2011, new releases have been offered annually.

- Mac OS X 10.0 – codenamed "Cheetah", released Saturday, March 24, 2001
- Mac OS X 10.1 – codenamed "Puma", released Tuesday, September 25, 2001
- Mac OS X Jaguar – version 10.2, released Friday, August 23, 2002
- Mac OS X Panther – version 10.3, released Friday, October 24, 2003
- Mac OS X Tiger – version 10.4, released Friday, April 29, 2005
- Mac OS X Leopard – version 10.5, released Friday, October 26, 2007
- Mac OS X Snow Leopard – version 10.6, released Monday, August 28, 2009
- Mac OS X Lion – version 10.7, released Wednesday, July 20, 2011
- OS X Mountain Lion – version 10.8, released Wednesday, July 25, 2012
- OS X Mavericks – version 10.9, released Tuesday, October 22, 2013
- OS X Yosemite – version 10.10, released Thursday, October 16, 2014
- OS X El Capitan – version 10.11, released Wednesday, September 30, 2015
- macOS Sierra – version 10.12, released Tuesday, September 20, 2016
- macOS High Sierra – version 10.13, released Monday, September 25, 2017
- macOS Mojave – version 10.14, released Monday, September 24, 2018
- macOS Catalina – version 10.15, released Monday, October 7, 2019
- macOS Big Sur – version 11, released Thursday, November 12, 2020
- macOS Monterey – version 12, released Monday, October 25, 2021
- macOS Ventura – version 13, released Monday, October 24, 2022
- macOS Sonoma – version 14, released Tuesday, September 26, 2023
- macOS Sequoia – version 15, released Monday, September 16, 2024
- macOS Tahoe – version 26, released Monday, September 15, 2025
- macOS Golden Gate – version 27, released Monday, September 14, 2026

macOS Big Sur's version was initially 10.16 for the first two betas; however, its version number was updated to 11.0 in the third beta.

Since 2025, macOS's version number is based on the year following the year in which it will first be released, as is the case for all Apple operating systems released ever since.

==== Server ====
An early server computing version of the system was released in 1999 as a technology preview. It was followed by several more official server-based releases. Server functionality has instead been offered as an add-on for the desktop system since 2011.

- Mac OS X Server 1.0 – code-named "Hera", released in 1999
- Mac OS X Server – later called "OS X Server" and "macOS Server", released between 2001 and 2022.

== Other projects ==
=== Shipped ===
==== A/ROSE ====
The Apple Real-time Operating System Environment (A/ROSE) is a small embedded operating system which runs on the Macintosh Coprocessor Platform, an expansion card for the Macintosh. It is a single "overdesigned" hardware platform on which third-party vendors build practically any product, reducing the otherwise heavy workload of developing a NuBus-based expansion card. The first version of the system was ready for use in February 1988.

==== A/UX ====
In 1988, Apple released its first UNIX-based OS, A/UX, which is a UNIX operating system with the Mac OS look and feel. It was not very competitive for its time, due in part to the crowded UNIX market and Macintosh hardware lacking high-end design features present on workstation-class computers. Most of its sales were to the U.S. government, where MacOS lacks POSIX compliance.

==== MAE ====
The Macintosh Application Environment (MAE) is a software package introduced by Apple in 1994 that allows certain Unix-based computer workstations to run Macintosh applications. MAE uses the X Window System to emulate a Macintosh Finder-style graphical user interface. The last version, MAE 3.0, is compatible with System 7.5.3. MAE was published for Sun Microsystems SPARCstation and Hewlett-Packard systems. It was discontinued on May 14, 1998.

==== MkLinux ====
Announced at the 1996 Worldwide Developers Conference (WWDC), MkLinux is an open source operating system that was started by the OSF Research Institute and Apple in February 1996 to port Linux to the PowerPC platform, and thus Macintosh computers. In mid 1998, the community-led MkLinux Developers Association took over development of the operating system. MkLinux is short for "Microkernel Linux", which refers to its adaptation of the monolithic Linux kernel to run as a server hosted atop the Mach microkernel version 3.0.

=== Cancelled projects ===
==== Star Trek ====
The Star Trek project (as in "to boldly go where no Mac has gone before") was a secret prototype beginning in 1992, to port the classic Mac OS to Intel-compatible x86 personal computers. In partnership with Apple and with support from Intel, the project was instigated by Novell, which was looking to integrate its DR-DOS with the Mac OS GUI as a mutual response to the monopoly of Microsoft's Windows 3.0 and MS-DOS. A team consisting of four from Apple and four from Novell got the Macintosh Finder and some basic applications, such as QuickTime, running smoothly. The project was canceled one year later in early 1993 but was partially reused when porting the Mac OS to PowerPC.

==== Taligent ====
Taligent (a portmanteau of "talent" and "intelligent") is an object-oriented operating system and the company producing it. Started as the Pink project within Apple to provide a replacement for the classic Mac OS, it was later spun off into a joint venture with IBM as part of the AIM alliance, with the purpose of building a platform to compete with Microsoft Cairo and NeXTSTEP. The development process never worked and has been cited as an example of a project death march. Apple pulled out of the project in 1995 before the code had been delivered.

==== Copland ====
Copland was a project at Apple to create an updated version of the classic Mac OS. It was to have introduced protected memory, preemptive multitasking, and new underlying operating system features, yet still be compatible with existing Mac software. They originally planned the follow-up release Gershwin to add multithreading and other advanced features. New features were added more rapidly than they could be completed, and the completion date slipped into the future with no sign of a release. In 1996, Apple canceled the project outright and sought a suitable third-party replacement. Copland development ended in August 1996, and in December 1996, Apple announced that it was buying NeXT for its NeXTSTEP operating system.

== Timeline ==
Timeline of Mac operating systems

== See also ==
- Comparison of operating systems
- History of the graphical user interface
- Mac
- List of Mac software
