= Mac OS (disambiguation) =

Mac OS is a series of Macintosh operating systems.

It may also refer to:

- Classic Mac OS, formerly Mac OS (version 9 and earlier)
- macOS, the current OS (version 10.12 and later)

== See also ==
- List of Apple operating systems
