= Apple File Exchange =

Apple File Exchange (AFE) is a utility program for Apple Macintosh computers. It was included on the Apple "Tidbits" or "Install 2" disk in system versions 7.0 through 7.1. In System 7.5 (released in 1994), it was replaced by PC Exchange.

Apple File Exchange could read floppy disks from DOS/Windows and ProDOS (Apple II) systems, as well as disks from Macs.

This utility enabled Macs to read PC disks, but only if they were inserted after launching Apple File Exchange. If Apple File Exchange was not launched while inserting PC-formatted floppy, the Mac would complain that the disk inserted "was not a Macintosh disk" and requested initialisation.

Apple File Exchange was a file content translator, in contrast to the File System Translator of Apple GS/OS which just translated the file system between different computers' storage formats. AFE could convert data files produced by one program for use in another, e.g. between AppleWorks and ClarisWorks.

== Bugs ==
A high-density diskette in DOS format formatted as a 720K disk would not function correctly; the Mac assumed that any high-density disk has been formatted as an HD disk. To solve this problem, a user could cover the square hole with a piece of tape opposite the write-protect tab, and re-insert the disk. (This square hole identifies the disk as a high-density disk.) Covering the square hole will make it appear to disk drive as a DD disk.
