= Motherboard =

Main printed circuit board used for a computing device

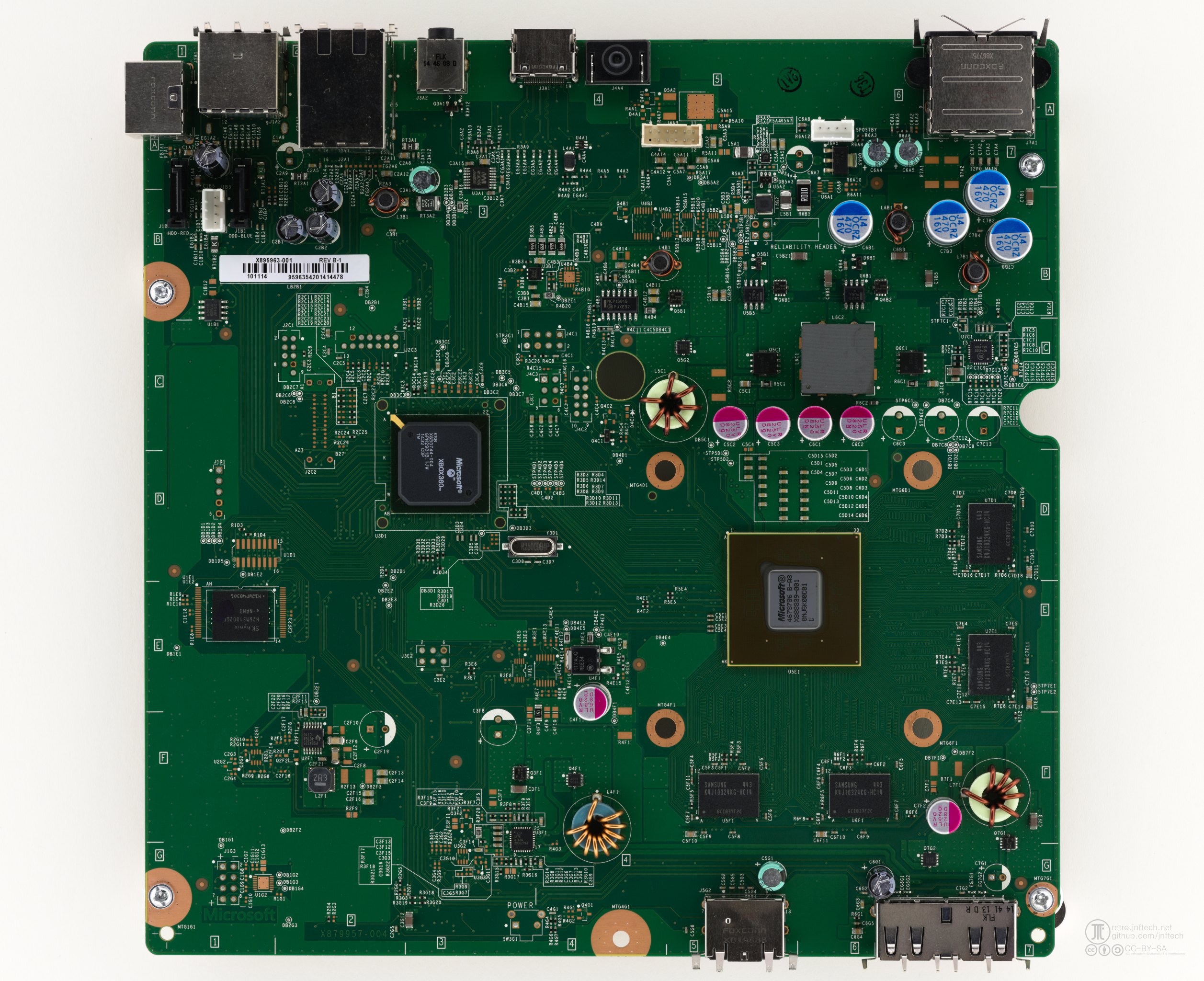
The motherboard of a Microsoft Xbox 360 E console

A motherboard, also known as a mainboard, system board, logic board, and informally mobo (see § Nomenclature), is the main printed circuit board (PCB) in general-purpose computers and other expandable systems. It holds and allows communication between many of the crucial electronic components of a system, such as the central processing unit (CPU) and memory, and provides connectors for other peripherals.

Unlike a backplane, a motherboard usually contains significant sub-systems, such as the CPU, the chipset's input/output and memory controllers, interface connectors, and other components integrated for general use.

== Nomenclature ==
Oxford English Dictionary traces the origin of the word motherboard to 1965, its earliest-found attestation occurring in the magazine Electronics. The term alludes to its importance and size compared to the components attached to it, being the "mother of all boards" in a computer system.

Several alternative terms for motherboard have been used in technical documentation and industry practice, including mainboard, system board, logic board, baseboard, and the informal mobo.

System board was used by IBM in documentation for the IBM PC and its derivatives; however, higher-end models in the PS/2 line, such as the Model 80, used the term planar instead. Apple commonly uses logic board in its technical documentation for products such as the Apple II and the Mac. Intel typically uses baseboard in its technical manuals, though it also uses motherboard interchangeably. The term mobo is an informal truncation of motherboard, popularized by computer enthusiasts and builders in the 1990s.

The term mainboard sometimes describes a device with a single board and no additional expansions or capability, such as controlling boards in laser printers, television sets, washing machines, mobile phones, and other embedded systems with limited expansion abilities.

== History ==
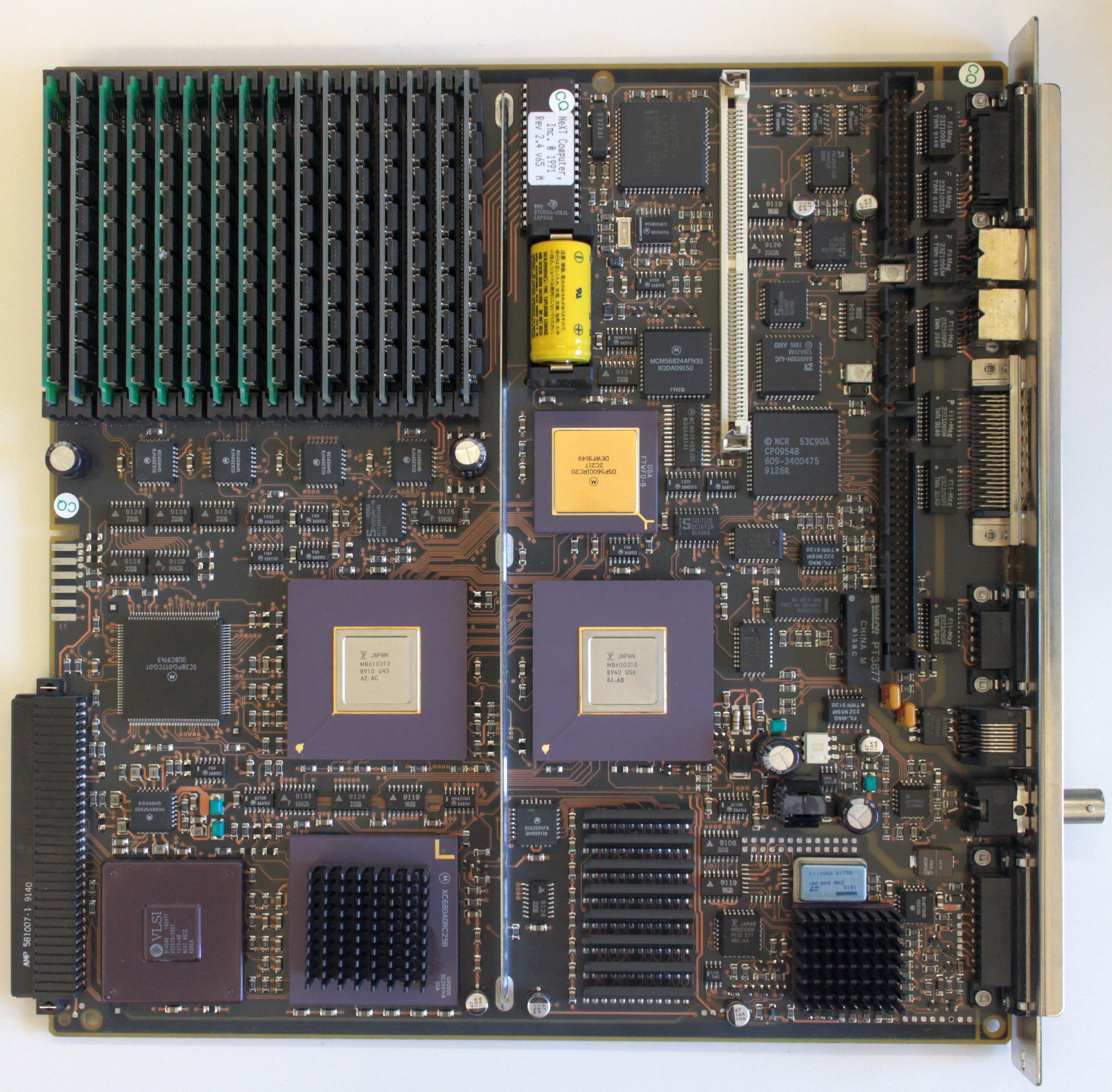
Mainboard of a NeXTcube computer (1990), featuring a Motorola 68040 microprocessor running at 25 MHz and a digital signal processor Motorola 56001 operating at 25 MHz. The DSP was directly accessible via a connector on the rear panel.

Before the advent of the microprocessor, the central processing unit (CPU) of a computer was typically implemented using multiple printed circuit boards housed in a card cage, interconnected via a backplane—a board containing sockets into which the individual circuit boards were inserted. Early systems used discrete copper wiring between connector pins, but printed circuit boards quickly became the standard. The CPU, main memory, and peripheral components were each located on separate boards connected through the backplane.

With the rise of microprocessors, CPU functionality and supporting circuitry were consolidated onto a single board, while memory and peripherals remained on separate expansion cards plugged into the backplane. A prominent example is the S-100 bus, widely used in 1970s microcomputer systems such as the Altair 8800.

In the 1980s, popular personal computers like the Apple II and IBM Personal Computer featured publicly available schematic diagrams and technical documentation. This openness enabled rapid reverse engineering and the development of third-party motherboards. These clone and upgrade boards often provided enhanced performance or additional features, and were commonly used to modernize or replace original manufacturer hardware.

The first backplane to qualify as a motherboard was the Planar Breadboard, designed by IBM engineer Patty McHugh and used in the 1981 IBM Personal Computer.

During the late 1980s and early 1990s, it became economical to move an increasing number of peripheral functions onto the motherboard. In the late 1980s, personal computer motherboards began to include single ICs (also called Super I/O chips) capable of supporting a set of low-speed peripherals: PS/2 keyboard and mouse, floppy disk drive, serial ports, and parallel ports. By the late 1990s, many personal computer motherboards included consumer-grade embedded audio, video, storage, and networking functions without the need for any expansion cards at all; higher-end systems for 3D gaming and computer graphics typically retained only the graphics card as a separate component. Business PCs, workstations, and servers were more likely to need expansion cards, either for more robust functions, or for higher speeds; those systems often had fewer embedded components.

Laptop and notebook computers that were developed in the 1990s integrated the most common peripherals. This even included motherboards with no upgradeable components, a trend that would continue as smaller systems were introduced after the turn of the century (like the tablet computer and the netbook). Memory, processors, network controllers, power source, and storage would be integrated into some systems.

== Design ==
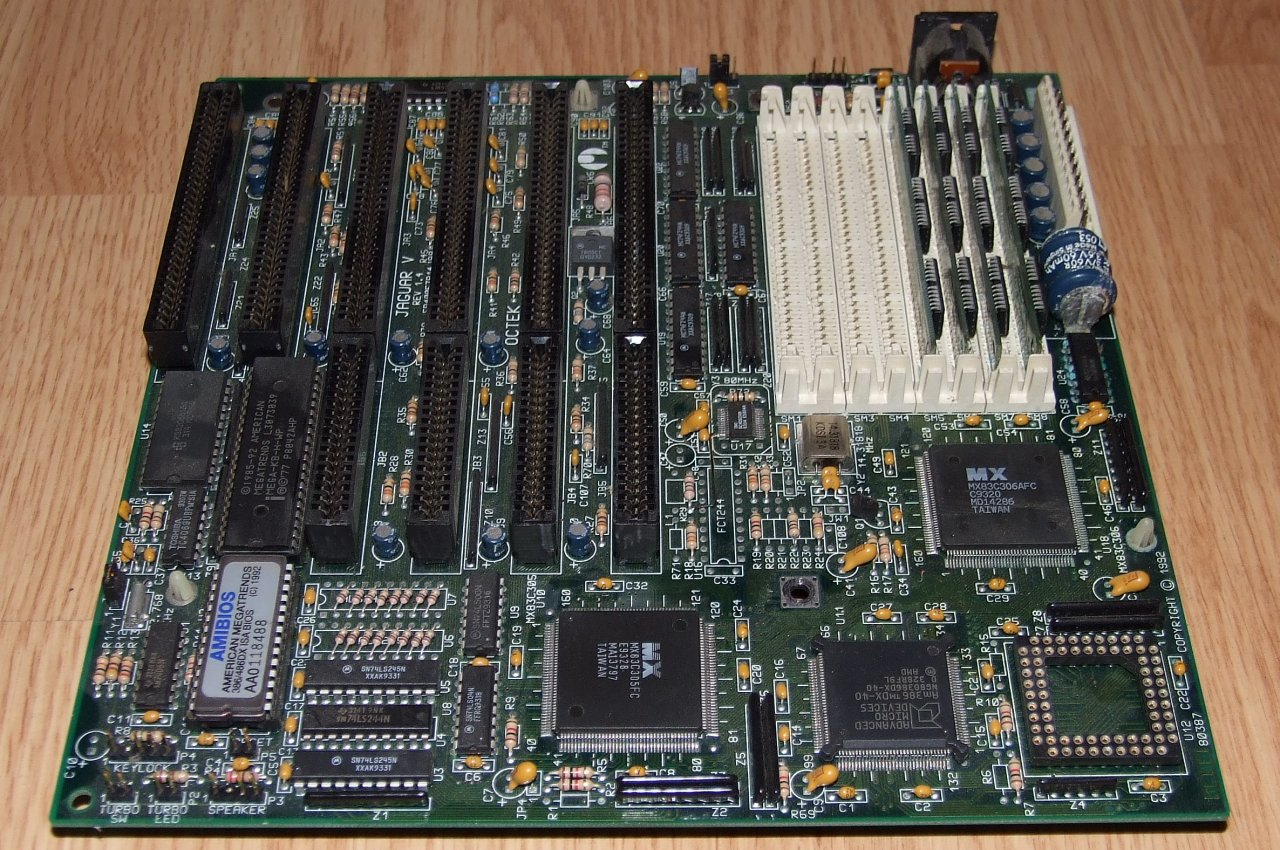
The Octek Jaguar V motherboard from 1993. This board has few onboard peripherals, as evidenced by the 6 slots provided for ISA cards and the lack of other built-in external interface connectors. Note the large AT keyboard connector at the back right is its only peripheral interface.

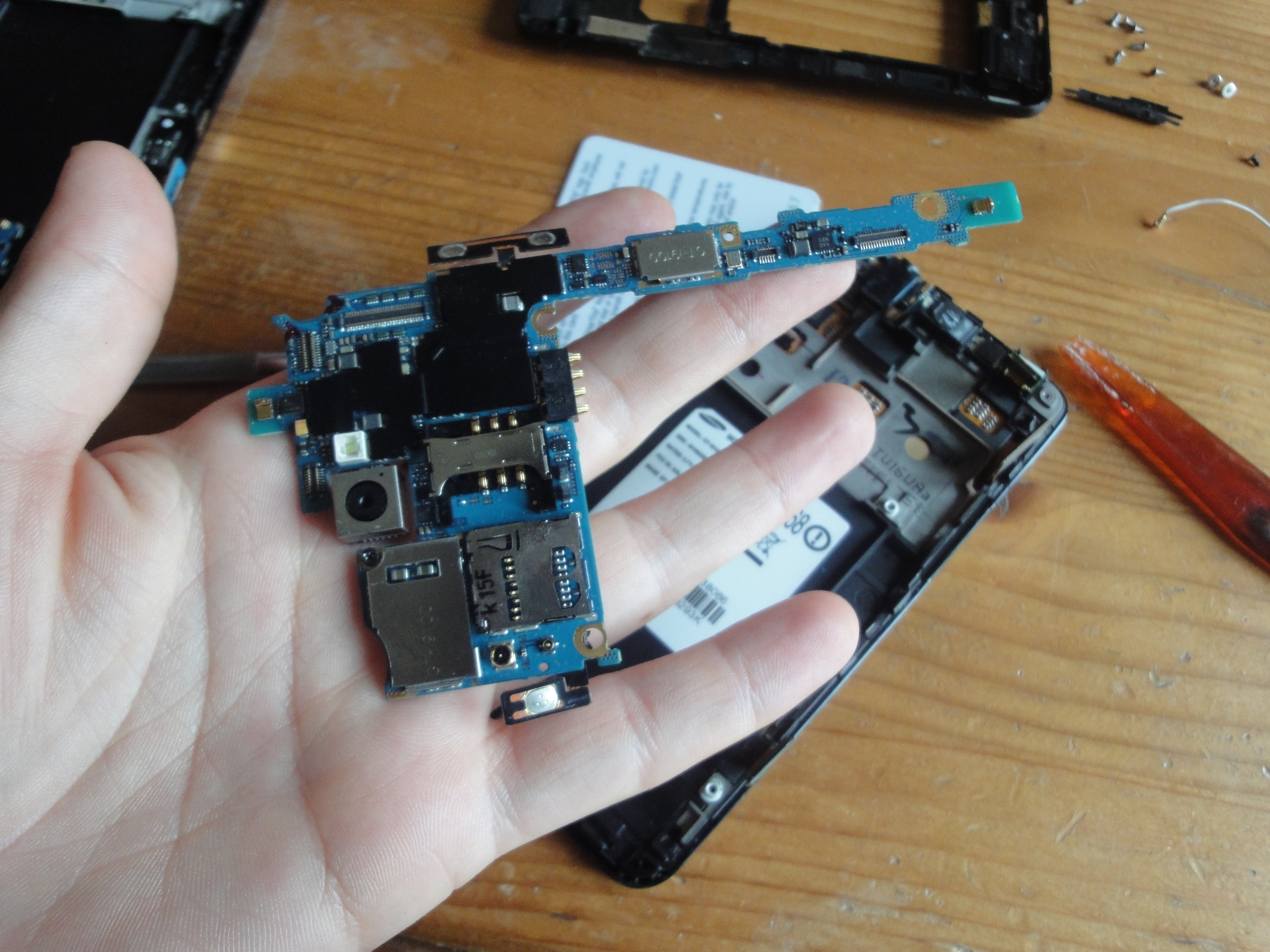
The motherboard of a Samsung Galaxy SII; almost all functions of the device are integrated into a very small board.

A motherboard provides the electrical connections by which the other components of the system communicate. Unlike a backplane, it also contains the central processing unit and hosts other subsystems and devices.

A typical desktop computer has its microprocessor, main memory, and other essential components connected to the motherboard. Other components such as external storage, controllers for video display and sound, and peripheral devices may be attached to the motherboard as plug-in cards or via cables; in modern microcomputers, it is increasingly common to integrate some of these peripherals into the motherboard itself.

An important component of a motherboard is the microprocessor's supporting chipset, which provides the supporting interfaces between the CPU and the various buses and external components. This chipset determines, to an extent, the features and capabilities of the motherboard.

Modern motherboards include:

- CPU sockets (or CPU slots) in which one or more microprocessors may be installed. In the case of CPUs in ball grid array packages, such as the VIA Nano and the Goldmont Plus, the CPU is directly soldered to the motherboard.
- Memory slots into which the system's main memory is to be installed, typically in the form of DIMM modules containing DRAM chips. Can be DDR3, DDR4, DDR5, or onboard LPDDRx. Furthermore, some motherboards have dual memory slots which allows the installation of different memory types, such as either DDR2 or DDR3.
- The chipset which forms an interface between the CPU, main memory, and peripheral buses
- Non-volatile memory chips (usually flash memory in modern motherboards) containing the system's firmware or BIOS
- The clock generator which produces the system clock signal to synchronize the various components
- Slots for expansion cards (the interface to the system via the buses supported by the chipset)
- Power connectors, which receive electrical power from the computer power supply and distribute it to the CPU, chipset, main memory, and expansion cards. As of 2007, some graphics cards (e.g. GeForce 8 and Radeon R600) require more power than the motherboard can provide, and thus dedicated connectors have been introduced to attach them directly to the power supply.
- Connectors for hard disk drives, optical disc drives, or solid-state drives, typically SATA and NVMe

Additionally, nearly all motherboards include logic and connectors to support commonly used input devices, such as USB for mouse devices and keyboards. Early personal computers such as the Apple II and IBM PC include only this minimal peripheral support on the motherboard. Video interface hardware was also occasionally integrated into the motherboard; for example, on the Apple II. It was even less common on IBM-compatible computers, such as the IBM PCjr. Additional peripherals such as disk controllers and serial ports were provided as expansion cards.

Given the high thermal design power of high-speed computer CPUs and components, modern motherboards nearly always include heat sinks and mounting points for fans to dissipate excess heat.

=== Form factor ===
Motherboards are produced in a variety of sizes and shapes called form factors, some of which are specific to individual computer manufacturers. However, the motherboards used in IBM-compatible systems are designed to fit various case sizes. As of 2024, most desktop computer motherboards use the ATX standard form factor — even those found in Macintosh and Sun computers, which have not been built from commodity components. A case's motherboard and power supply unit (PSU) form factor must all match, though some smaller form factor motherboards of the same family will fit larger cases. For example, an ATX case will usually accommodate a microATX motherboard. Laptop computers generally use highly integrated, miniaturized, and customized motherboards. This is one of the reasons that laptop computers are difficult to upgrade and expensive to repair. Often the failure of one laptop component requires the replacement of the entire motherboard, which is usually more expensive than a desktop motherboard.

=== CPU sockets ===
A CPU socket (central processing unit) or slot is an electrical component that attaches to a printed circuit board (PCB) and is designed to house a CPU (also called a microprocessor). It is a special type of integrated circuit socket designed for very high pin counts. A CPU socket provides many functions, including a physical structure to support the CPU, support for a heat sink, facilitating replacement (as well as reducing cost), and most importantly, forming an electrical interface both with the CPU and the PCB. CPU sockets on the motherboard can most often be found in most desktop and server computers (laptops typically use surface mount CPUs), particularly those based on the Intel x86 architecture. A CPU socket type and the motherboard chipset must support the CPU series and speed.

=== Integrated peripherals ===
Block diagram of an early 2000s motherboard, which supports many on-board peripheral functions as well as several expansion slots

With the steadily declining costs and size of integrated circuits, it is now possible to include support for many peripherals on the motherboard. By combining many functions on one PCB, the physical size and total cost of the system may be reduced; highly-integrated motherboards are thus especially popular in small form factor and budget computers. The integrated peripherals may also be called onboard devices.

- Disk controllers for SATA drives, and historical PATA drives
- Historical floppy-disk controller
- Integrated graphics controller supporting 2D and 3D graphics, with VGA, DVI, HDMI, DisplayPort, and TV output
- Integrated sound card supporting 8-channel (7.1) audio and S/PDIF output
- Ethernet network controller for connection to a LAN and to receive Internet
- USB controller
- Wireless network interface controller
- Bluetooth controller
- Temperature, voltage, and fan-speed sensors that allow software to monitor the health of computer components.
- Other onboard devices, such as PMIC

=== Peripheral card slots ===
A typical motherboard will have a different number of slots, depending on its standard and form factor.

Many motherboards feature two or more PCI Express (PCIe) x16 slots, enabling support for multiple graphics cards or connecting multiple monitors directly without requiring specialized hardware. Some high-end models support multi-GPU technologies such as Nvidia's Scalable Link Interface (SLI) and AMD's CrossFire (formerly ATI CrossFire), which allow two to four graphics cards to operate in parallel, improving performance in graphics-intensive applications like gaming and video editing. However, as modern games and APIs increasingly favor single powerful GPUs, and with both Nvidia and AMD having largely discontinued active support for these technologies, multi-GPU configurations are now less common.

Modern motherboards also feature PCIe x1 and possibly legacy PCI slots for other peripherals.

A standard, modern ATX motherboard will typically have two or three PCIe x16 slots for a graphics card, one or two legacy PCI slots for various expansion cards, and one or two PCIe x1 slots. A standard EATX motherboard will have two to four PCIe x16 slots for graphics cards, and a varying number of PCI and PCIe x1 slots. It can sometimes also have a PCIe x4 slot (although this will vary between brands and models).

Modern motherboards typically include one or more M.2 slots—some high-end models offer up to four. These slots support a variety of devices, including NVMe-based solid-state drives (SSDs), SATA-based M.2 SSDs, and wireless network interface controllers (such as Wi-Fi and Bluetooth modules). M.2 provides a compact, high-speed interface that leverages the PCIe or SATA bus, depending on the configuration.

=== Temperature and reliability ===
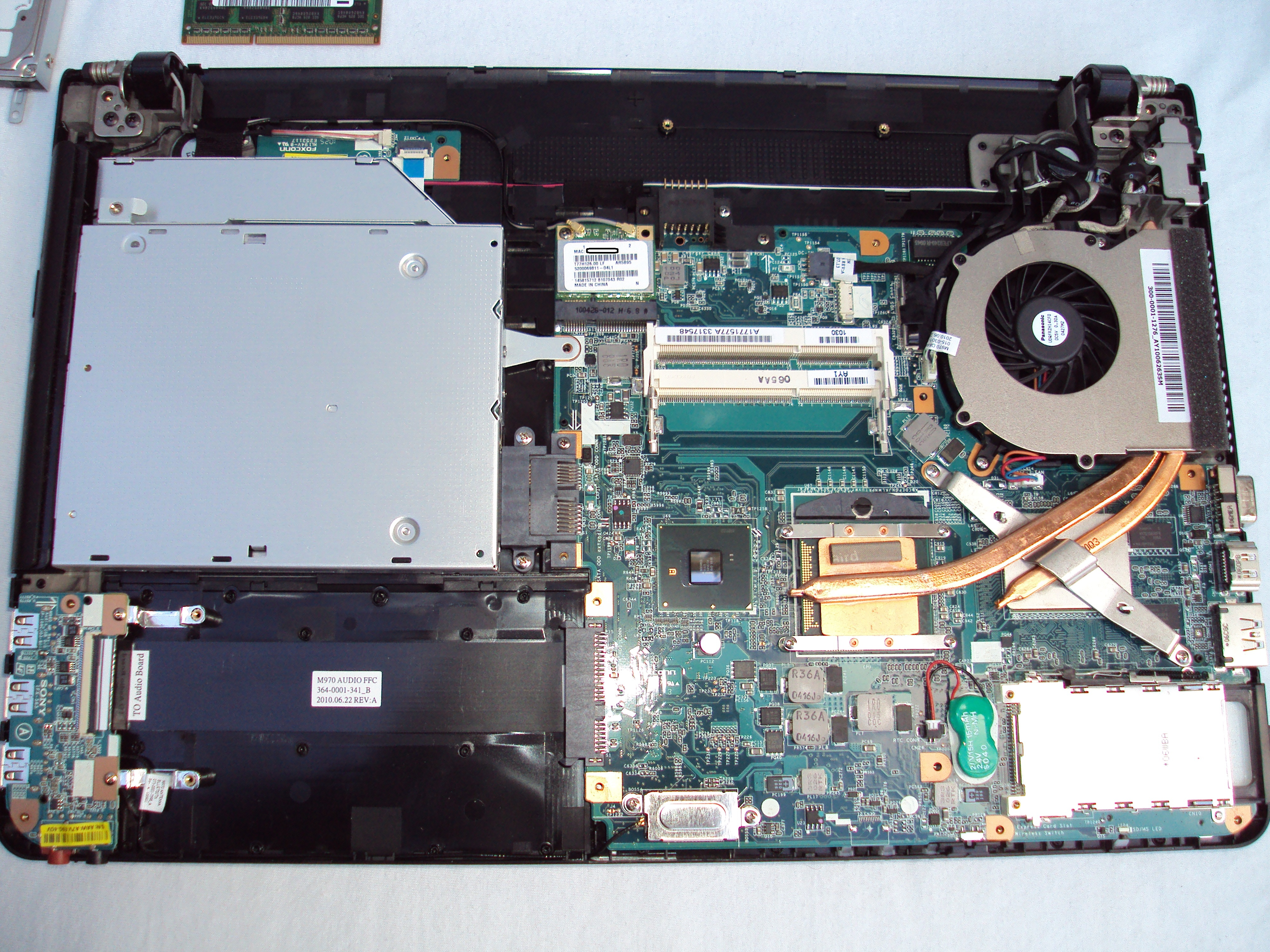
A motherboard of a Vaio E series laptop (right)

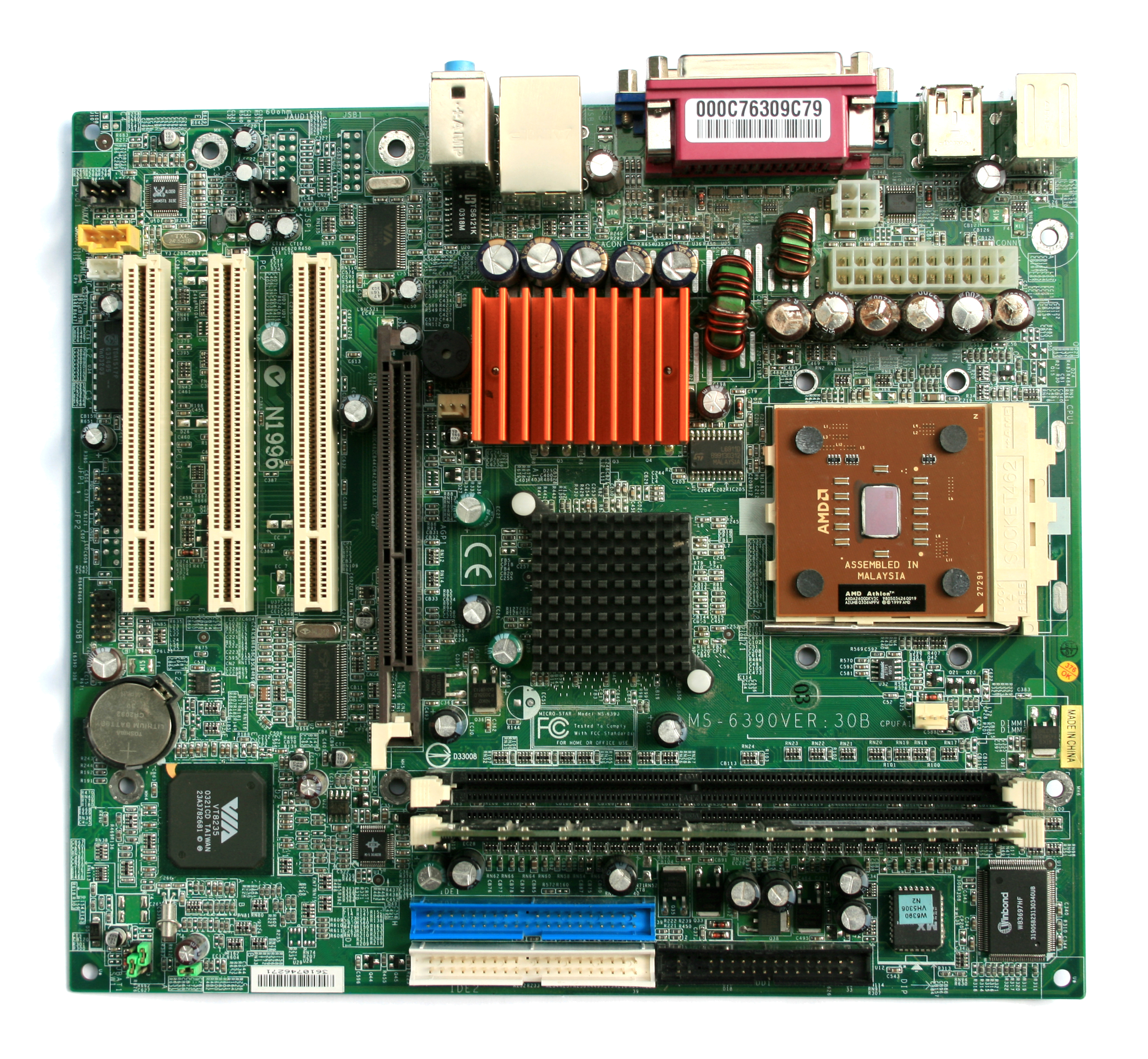
A microATX motherboard with some faulty capacitors

Motherboards are generally air cooled, with heat sinks often mounted on larger chips in modern motherboards. Insufficient or improper cooling can cause damage to the internal components of the computer, or even cause it to crash. Passive cooling, or a single fan mounted on the power supply, was sufficient for many desktop computer CPUs until the late 1990s; since then, most have required CPU fans mounted on heat sinks, due to rising clock speeds and power consumption. Most motherboards have connectors for additional computer fans and integrated temperature sensors to detect motherboard and CPU temperatures and controllable fan connectors which the BIOS or operating system can use to regulate fan speed. Alternatively, computers can use a water cooling system instead of many fans.

Some small form factor computers and home theater PCs designed for quiet and energy-efficient operation boast fan-less designs. This typically requires the use of a low-power CPU, as well as a careful layout of the motherboard and other components to allow for heat sink placement.

A 2003 study found that some spurious computer crashes and general reliability issues, ranging from screen image distortions to I/O read/write errors, can be attributed not to software or peripheral hardware but to aging capacitors on PC motherboards. Ultimately, this was shown to be the result of a faulty electrolyte formulation, an issue termed capacitor plague.

Modern motherboards use electrolytic capacitors to filter the DC power distributed around the board. These capacitors age at a temperature-dependent rate, as their water based electrolytes slowly evaporate. This can lead to loss of capacitance and subsequent motherboard malfunctions due to voltage instabilities. While most capacitors are rated for 2000 hours of operation at 105 °C (221 °F), their expected design life roughly doubles for every 10 °C (18 °F) below this. At 65 °C (149 °F) a lifetime of 3 to 4 years can be expected. However, many manufacturers deliver substandard capacitors, which significantly reduce life expectancy. Inadequate case cooling and elevated temperatures around the CPU socket exacerbate this problem. With top blowers, the motherboard components can be kept under 95 °C (203 °F), effectively doubling the motherboard lifetime.

Mid-range and high-end motherboards, on the other hand, use solid capacitors exclusively. For every 10 °C less, their average lifespan is multiplied approximately by three, resulting in a 6-times higher lifetime expectancy at 65 °C (149 °F). These capacitors may be rated for 5000, 10000 or 12000 hours of operation at 105 °C (221 °F), extending the projected lifetime in comparison with standard solid capacitors.

In desktop PCs and notebook computers, the motherboard cooling and monitoring solutions are usually based on a super I/O chip or an embedded controller.

== Bootstrapping ==
Modern motherboards contain firmware stored in non-volatile memory such as ROM, EPROM, EEPROM, or NOR flash, which is responsible for initializing system hardware and loading an operating system from a boot device. The terms booting and bootstrapping derive from the metaphor "pulling oneself up by one's bootstraps", reflecting the self-starting nature of the process.

=== IBM-compatible personal computers (PC) ===
In early microcomputers like the Apple II and IBM Personal Computer, firmware was stored in socketed ROM chips on the motherboard. Upon power-up, the central processing unit (CPU) would load its program counter with the address of the boot ROM and begin executing instructions from it. These instructions performed a power-on self-test (POST), initialized hardware components, displayed system information, verified random-access memory (RAM), and attempted to locate and load an operating system from a bootable peripheral device. If no such device was found, the system would either execute built-in software from ROM—such as Cassette BASIC (commonly known as ROM BASIC)—or display an error message, depending on the model. For instance, both the Apple II and the original IBM PC would launch their built-in BASIC interpreter when no bootable disk was present.

The boot firmware in modern IBM PC compatible motherboard designs contains either a BIOS, as did the boot ROM on the original IBM PC, or UEFI. UEFI is a successor to BIOS that became popular after Microsoft began requiring it for a system to be certified to run Windows 8.

When the computer is powered on, the boot firmware tests and configures memory, circuitry, and peripherals. This Power-On Self Test (POST) may include testing some of the following things:

- Video card
- Expansion cards inserted into slots, such as conventional PCI and PCI Express
- Historical floppy drive
- Temperatures, voltages, and fan speeds for hardware monitoring
- CMOS memory used to store BIOS configuration
- Keyboard and mouse
- Sound card
- Network adapter
- Optical drives: CD-ROM or DVD-ROM
- Hard disk drive and solid-state drive
- Security devices, such as a fingerprint reader
- USB devices, such as a USB mass storage device

=== SoCs and embedded systems ===
In embedded systems, simpler boot firmware, such as Das U-Boot, may be used on the motherboard.

== See also ==
- Accelerated Graphics Port (AGP)
- Basic Input/Output System (BIOS)
- Chip creep
- CMOS battery
- Computer case screws
- Daughterboard
- Expansion card
- List of computer hardware manufacturers
- M.2
- Overclocking
- Peripheral Component Interconnect (PCI)
  - PCI-X
  - PCI Express (PCIe)
- Single-board computer
- Switched-mode power supply#Applications
- Symmetric multiprocessing
- System on a chip
- U.2
- UEFI (Unified Extensible Firmware Interface)
