= Apple Pascal =

Programming system for Apple II and III

- Version 1.2 on an Apple II
- Developer: Apple Computer
- OS family: UCSD Pascal
- Working state: Historic
- Source model: Closed source
- Initial release: August 1979; 46 years ago
- Latest release: 1.3 (Apple II); 1.1 (Apple III) / 1984; 42 years ago
- Kernel type: Monolithic
- License: Apple Software License Agreement

Apple Pascal is an implementation of Pascal for the Apple II and Apple III computer series, based on UCSD Pascal. Just like other UCSD Pascal implementations, it runs on its own operating system (Apple Pascal Operating System, a derivative of UCSD p-System with graphical extensions).

Originally released for the Apple II in August 1979, just after Apple DOS 3.2, Apple Pascal pioneered features that were incorporated into DOS 3.3, as well as others that would not be seen again until the introduction of ProDOS.

The Apple Pascal software package also included disk maintenance utilities, and an assembler meant to complement Apple's built-in "monitor" assembler. A FORTRAN compiler (written by Silicon Valley Software of Sunnyvale, California) compiling to the same p-code as Pascal was also available.

== Comparison of Pascal OS with DOS 3.2 ==
Apple Pascal Operating System introduced a new disk format. Instead of dividing the disk into 256-byte sectors as in DOS 3.2, Apple Pascal divides it into "blocks" of 512 bytes each. The p-System also introduced a different method for saving and retrieving files. Under Apple DOS, files were saved to any available sector that the OS could find, regardless of location. Over time, this could lead to file system fragmentation, slowing access to the disk. Apple Pascal attempted to rectify this by saving only to consecutive blocks on the disk.

Other innovations introduced in the file system included the introduction of a timestamp feature. Previously only a file's name, basic type, and size would be shown. Disks could also be named for the first time.

Limitations of the p-System included new restrictions on the naming of files. Writing files only on consecutive blocks also created problems, because over time free space tended to become too fragmented to store new files. A utility called KRUNCH was included in the package to consolidate free space.

The biggest problem with the Apple Pascal system was that it was too big to fit on one floppy disk. This meant that on a system with only one floppy disk drive, frequent disk swapping was needed. A system needed at least two disk drives in order to use the operating system properly.

== Release history ==
Platform	Date	OS
Apple II	1979	Apple Pascal 1.0
Apple II	1980	Apple Pascal 1.1
Apple II	1983	Apple Pascal 1.2
Apple II	1985	Apple Pascal 1.3
Apple III	1981	Apple Pascal 1.0
Apple III	1983	Apple Pascal 1.1

== Sources ==
- Apple (1980). Apple II Pascal Operating System Reference Manual (PDF). Archived from the original (PDF) on 2015-04-30.
- Apple (1981). Apple III Pascal - Introduction, Filer and Editor (PDF).
- Apple (1983). Apple III Update 1.1 (PDF).
- Hyde, Randall (1984). p-Source: Guide to Apple Pascal System. Brady. ISBN 978-0835954105.
