= Apple DOS =

Family of disk operating systems

- Apple computer running a Hello World program
- Developer: Apple Computer
- Written in: Assembly
- Working state: Discontinued
- Source model: Closed source
- Initial release: 1978; 48 years ago
- Latest release: 3.3 / 1980; 46 years ago
- Kernel type: Monolithic kernel
- License: Apple Software License Agreement

Apple DOS is a disk operating system (DOS) used by the Apple II series from 1978 until 1983, when it was superseded by Apple ProDOS. It had three major releases: versions 3.1, 3.2, and 3.3. When Apple Computer introduced the Apple II in 1977, it included Integer BASIC but lacked a DOS. Users could enter and run programs in BASIC and store programs and data on compact cassette tapes. Steve Wozniak, Apple's co-founder, designed the Disk II controller in 1977. However, with a tight deadline and limited experience developing a DOS, Apple hired an outside company to create one. After considering Digital Research's CP/M, Apple contracted Shepardson Microsystems on April 10, 1978, to develop Apple DOS for US$13,000 (equivalent to $64,171 in 2025), with delivery scheduled within 35 days. Apple supplied detailed specifications, and employee Randy Wigginton worked with Shepardson's Paul Laughton during development. Laughton wrote the software using a minicomputer and punched cards.

== Version history ==
Apple did not release versions named Apple DOS 1 or 2. Versions 0.1 through 2.8 were development revisions, followed by version 3.0, a renamed revision of 2.8 that was not publicly released because of bugs. Apple published no official documentation until the release of version 3.2.

Each of the three major releases had a minor revision intended to fix bugs. Only the revision of version 3.2 received a separate version number: Apple DOS 3.2.1.

Apple DOS 3.1 was publicly released in June 1978, more than a year after the Apple II's introduction. It was the first disk operating system released for any Apple computer. A subsequent bug-fix revision addressed an issue with the INIT command, which created disks that could boot only on computers with at least as much memory as the machine that created them. The MASTER CREATE utility addressed this limitation by creating a master boot disk containing a self-relocating version of DOS that could start on Apple II computers with different memory configurations.

Apple DOS 3.2 was released in 1979 to reflect changes in computer booting methods that were built into the successor of the Apple II, the Apple II Plus. New firmware included an auto-start feature which automatically found a disk controller and booted from it when the system was powered up—earning it the name "Autostart ROM". DOS 3.2.1 was then released in July 1979 with some minor bug fixes.

Apple DOS 3.3 was released in 1980. It improves various functions of release 3.2 including a rewrite of the RWTS to make it faster, while allowing for large gains in available floppy disk storage. The newer P5A/P6A PROMs in the disk controller enable the reading and writing of data at a higher density, so 16 sectors (4 KiB) can be stored per track instead of 13 sectors (3.25 KiB), increasing capacity from 113.75 KB to 140 KB per side – 16 KB of which is used by filesystem overhead and a copy of DOS, leaving 124 KB for user programs and data. DOS 3.3 is, however, not backward compatible; it cannot read or write DOS 3.2 disks. To address this problem, Apple Computer released "MUFFIN", a utility to migrate Apple DOS 3.2 files and programs to version 3.3 disks. Apple never offered a utility to copy in the other direction. To migrate Apple DOS 3.3 files back to version 3.2 disks, someone wrote a "NIFFUM" utility. There are also commercial utilities (such as Copy II Plus) that can copy files between either format (and eventually ProDOS as well). Release 3.3 also improves the ability to switch between Integer BASIC and Applesoft BASIC, if the computer has a language card (RAM expansion) or firmware card.

== Technical details ==
Apple DOS 3.1 disks use 13 sectors of data per track, each sector being 256 bytes. It uses 35 tracks per disk side, and can access only one side of the floppy disk, unless the user flipped the disk over. This gives the user a total storage capacity of 113.75 KB per side, of which about 10 KB are used to store DOS itself and the disk directory, leaving about 100 KB for user programs.

The first layer of the operating system is called RWTS, which stands for "read/write track sector". This layer consists of subroutines for track seeking, sector reading and writing, and disk formatting. An API called the File Manager was built on top of this, and implements functions to open, close, read, write, delete, lock (i.e. write-protect), unlock (i.e. write-enable), and rename files, and to verify a file's structural integrity. There is also a CATALOG function, for listing files on the diskette, and an INIT function, which formats a disk for use with DOS, storing a copy of DOS on the first three tracks, and storing a startup program (usually called HELLO) that is auto-started when this disk is booted from. On top of the File Manager API, the main DOS routines are implemented which hook into the machine's BASIC interpreter and intercept all disk commands. It provides BLOAD, BSAVE, and BRUN for storing, loading, and running binary executables. LOAD, RUN, and SAVE are provided for BASIC programs, and an EXEC was provided for running text-based batch files consisting of BASIC and DOS commands. Finally, four types of files exist, identified by letters in a catalog listing:

- I – Integer BASIC programs (stored in a compact format, not plain-text)
- A – Applesoft BASIC programs (also stored in a packed, space-saving format)
- B – Binary files, either executable machine-language programs, or data files
- T – ASCII text files (or plain-text, unpacked batch files)

There are four additional file types; "R", "S", and an additional "A" and "B", none of which are fully supported. DOS recognizes these types for catalog listings only, and there are no direct ways to manipulate these types of files. The "R" type found some use for relocatable binary executable files. A few programs support the "S" type as data files.

A call vector table in the region of $03D0–03FF_{16} allows programs to find DOS wherever it is loaded in the system memory. For example, if the DOS hooked into the BASIC CLI stops functioning, it can be reinitialized by calling location $03D0_{16} (976_{10}) – hence the traditional 3D0G ("3D0 go") command to return to BASIC from the System Monitor.

=== Boot loader ===
The process of loading Apple DOS involves a series of very tiny programs, each of which carries the loading process forward a few steps before passing control to the next program in the chain.

- Originally, the Apple II ROM did not support disk booting at all. At power-up it would display the System Monitor prompt. Both the Monitor and Integer BASIC have commands to redirect printing to a printer driver in a designated slot, so the conventional way to boot from disk then was to command the computer to start "printing" to the disk interface card, typically installed in slot 6, using the command 6 Control-P (from the ML monitor) or PR#6 (from BASIC). When the monitor or BASIC issued the next prompt character, the computer would call the ROM routines on the disk card to "print" to it, which would then proceed with the boot sequence. (One could use input redirection to similar ends.) Alternatively, from the ML monitor, the user could invoke the controller's boot code directly with a command like C600G.
- When the Apple II Plus was introduced, it included the ability to scan each expansion slot (working downward from slot 7 to slot 1) for a bootable expansion card ROM, and automatically call it.
- The expansion card ROM boot code attempts to boot from drive 1 of the controller by moving the read/write arm to track zero and attempting to read 256 bytes from sector zero of that track. (If no readable disk is available, the drive spins indefinitely until one is provided and the drive door is closed.)
- Sector zero contains a small program which instructs the computer to read sectors 0 through 9 of track zero into memory using part of the ROM boot code (rereading sector 0 in the process).
- The program in sectors 1–9 of track 0, including the complete RWTS code, then proceeds to load tracks 1 and 2, which contain the rest of DOS. On a system master disk, code is also included to determine the computer's RAM configuration and relocate DOS as high into system memory as possible, up to the 48 KB limit of the Apple II's main memory ($BFFF_{16}).
- Once DOS is loaded into memory, it attempts to load and execute a startup program as indicated in the DOS program code. This is commonly a BASIC language program named HELLO (or some other name) but DOS can be modified to run other types of programs at startup, such as an executable binary file. The appearance of the right-hand bracket (]) on the screen is an indication to the user that an Applesoft BASIC startup program is loading, while a greater-than symbol (>) indicates that an Integer BASIC program is loading. (These are the prompts for the respective versions of BASIC, which are being initialized at this point.)
- The startup program then begins executing.

=== Integer BASIC and Applesoft BASIC support ===
The original Apple II included BASIC interpreter in ROM known originally as Apple BASIC and later as Integer BASIC. Variables in this language can only handle integer numbers ranging from −32,768 to +32,767 (16-bit binary values); floating point numbers are not supported. Apple commissioned Microsoft to develop Applesoft BASIC, capable of handling floating-point numbers. Applesoft BASIC cannot run Integer BASIC programs, causing some users to resist upgrading to it.

DOS 3.3 was released when Applesoft BASIC was standard in ROM on the Apple II Plus, so Apple designed it to support switching back and forth between the two BASIC interpreters. Integer BASIC is loaded into RAM on the language card of Apple IIs (if present) and by typing FP or INT from BASIC, the user can switch between either version.

== Decline ==
After 1980, Apple DOS entered into a state of stagnation as Apple concentrated its efforts on the ill-fated Apple III computer and its SOS operating system. Two more versions of Apple DOS, both still called DOS 3.3 but with some bug fixes and better support for the new Apple IIe model, were released in early and mid-1983.

Without third-party patches, Apple DOS can only read floppy disks running in a 5.25-inch Disk II drive and cannot access any other media, such as hard disk drives, virtual RAM drives, or 3.5-inch floppy disk drives. The structure of Apple DOS disks (particularly the free sector map, which was restricted to part of a single sector) is such that it is not possible to have more than 400 KB available at a time per drive without a major rewrite of almost all sections of the code; this is the main reason Apple abandoned this iteration of DOS in 1983, when Apple DOS was entirely replaced by ProDOS.

ProDOS retains the 16-sector low-level format of DOS 3.3 for 5.25 inch disks, but introduces a new high-level format that is suitable for devices of up to 32 MB; this makes it suitable for hard disks from that era and 3.5-inch floppies. All the Apple computers from the II Plus onward can run both DOS 3.3 and ProDOS, the Plus requiring a "Language Card" memory expansion to use ProDOS; the e and later models have built-in Language Card hardware, and so can run ProDOS straight. ProDOS includes software to copy files from Apple DOS disks. However, many people who had no need for the improvements of ProDOS (and who did not like its much higher memory footprint) continued using Apple DOS or one of its clones long after 1983. The Apple convention of storing a bootable OS on every single floppy disk means that commercial software can be used no matter what OS the user owns. A program called DOS.MASTER enables users to have multiple virtual DOS 3.3 partitions on a larger ProDOS volume, which allows the use of many floppy-based DOS programs with a hard disk.

Shortly after ProDOS came out, Apple withdrew permission from third parties to redistribute DOS 3.3, but granted one company, Syndicomm, an exclusive license to resell DOS 3.3.

Commercial games usually did not use Apple DOS, instead having their own custom disk routines for copy protection purposes as well as for performance.

== Performance improvements ==
DOS's RWTS routine can read or write a track in two revolutions with proper interleaving. A sector of the spinning disk passes under the read/write head while the RWTS routine is decoding the just-read sector (or encoding the next one to be written), and if this missed sector is the next one needed, DOS needs to wait nearly an entire revolution of the disk for the sector to come around again. This is called "blowing a rev" and is a well-understood performance bottleneck in disk systems. To avoid this, the sectors on a DOS disk are arranged in an interleaved order:

0 7 e 6 d 5 c 4 b 3 a 2 9 1 8 f

Later, ProDOS arranged the sectors in this order:

0 8 1 9 2 a 3 b 4 c 5 d 6 e 7 f

When reading and decoding sector 0, then sector 8 passes by, so that sector 1, the next sector likely to be needed, will be available without waiting. When reading sector 7, two unneeded sectors, f and 0, pass by before sector 8 is available, and when reading sector 15, the drive will always have to wait an extra revolution for sector 0 on the same track. However, the sector 0 actually needed in most cases will be on the next-higher track, and that track can be arranged relative to the last one to allow the needed time to decode the just-read sector and move the head before sector 0 comes around. On average, a full track can be read in two revolutions of the disk.

The early DOS File Manager subverted this efficiency by copying bytes read from or written to a file one at a time between a disk buffer and main memory, requiring more time and resulting in DOS constantly blowing revs when reading or writing files. Programs became available early on to format disks with modified sector interleaves; these disks give DOS more time between sectors to copy the data, ameliorating the problem.

Later, programmers outside Apple rewrote the File Manager routines to avoid making the extra copy for most sectors of a file; RWTS was instructed to read or write sectors directly to or from main memory rather than from a disk buffer whenever a full sector was to be transferred. An early patch to provide this functionality was published in Call-A.P.P.L.E.. Speedups in the LOAD command of three to five times were typical.

This functionality soon appeared in commercial products, such as Pronto-DOS, Diversi-DOS, Hyper-DOS, and David-DOS, along with additional features, but it was never used in an official Apple DOS release. Similar functionality was, however, employed by Apple's successor operating system, ProDOS. The Apple IIGS-specific operating system GS/OS would eventually employ an even more efficient "scatter read" technique that would read any sector that happened to be passing under the read head if it was needed for the file being read.

== Source code release ==
In 2013, more than 35 years after the Apple II debuted, the original Apple DOS source code was released by the Computer History Museum on its website. It was donated by the original author, Paul Laughton.

== See also ==
- Apple GS/OS
- Apple ProDOS
- GEOS (8-bit operating system)
