= A/ROSE =

Embedded operating system

- Developer: Apple Computer
- OS family: Macintosh; Embedded operating systems
- Working state: Historic
- Initial release: February 1988; 38 years ago
- Supported platforms: Macintosh Coprocessor Platform for Macintosh (Motorola 68000)

A/ROSE (Apple Real-time Operating System Environment) is a small embedded operating system that runs on Apple Computer's "Macintosh Coprocessor Platform", an expansion card for the Macintosh.

The idea was to offer a single "overdesigned" hardware platform on which third-party vendors could build practically any product, reducing the otherwise heavy workload of developing a NuBus-based expansion card. However, the MCP cards were expensive, limiting the appeal of the concept. A/ROSE had very little use, apparently limited solely to Apple's own networking cards for serial I/O, Ethernet, Token Ring, and Twinax. GreenSpring Computers developed the RM1260, which is an IndustryPack (IP) carrier card with a 68000 CPU running A/ROSE and is intended for the data acquisition market.

== History ==
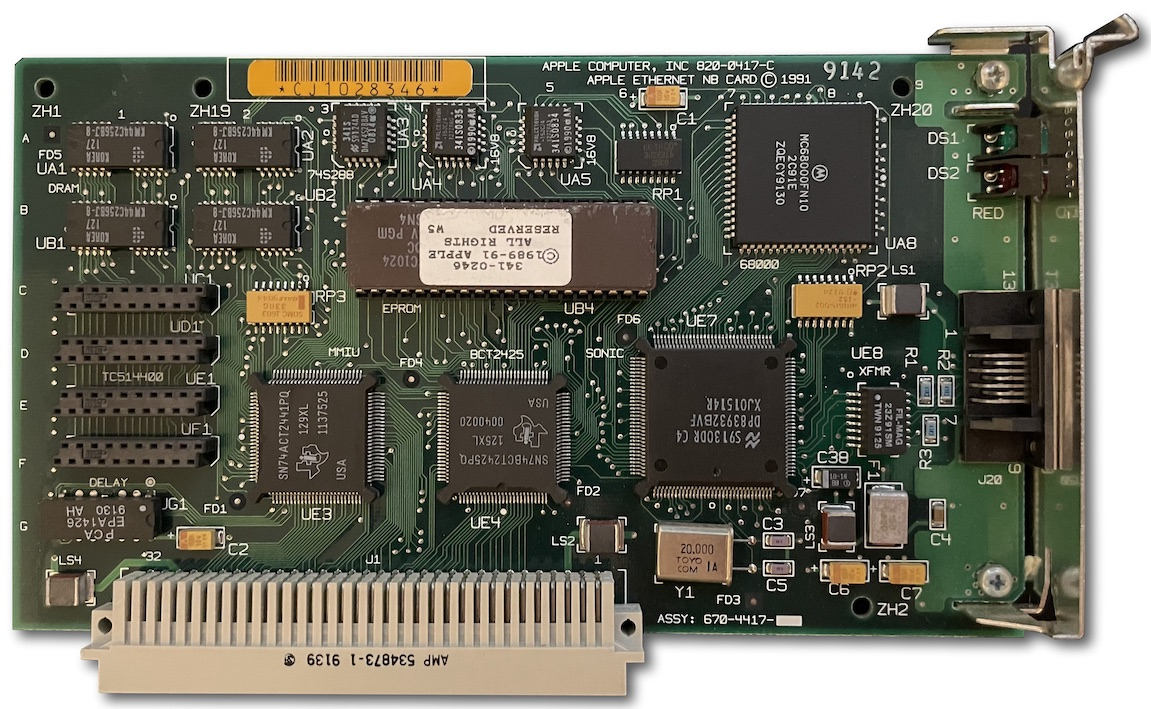
Apple released this A/ROSE-based Ethernet NuBus card with a Motorola 68000 processor.

A/ROSE and the MCP originated in August 1987 during the development of the Macintosh II. While working on various networking products for the new system, the developers realized that the existing classic Mac OS would make any "serious" card difficult to create, due to large latencies and the difficulty of writing complex device drivers. Their solution was to make an "intelligent" NuBus card that was essentially an entire computer on a card, containing its own Motorola 68000 processor, working space in RAM mirrored in the main system, and its own basic operating system. The first version of the system was ready for use in February 1988.

A/ROSE was internally called MR-DOS (Multitasking Realtime Distributed Operating System), but Microsoft (the developer of MS-DOS) did not appreciate the name and put pressure on Apple to change it. Eric M. Trehus, a QA engineer on the Token Ring card running A/ROSE reportedly said "A/ROSE by any other name is still MR-DOS."

A/ROSE is infamous for its esoteric purpose, which is generally not understood by Mac end users, and for causing many Mac emulators, such as Basilisk II, to produce a system error at boot time.

== Overview ==
A/ROSE is very small at 28 KB, with a 6 KB kernel. A/ROSE supports pre-emptive multitasking with round-robin scheduling of tasks, with a 110 microsecond context switch time and only 20 microseconds of latency (guaranteed interrupt response time). The system's task is primarily to move data around and start and stop tasks on the cards, and the entire API contains only ten calls.

A/ROSE is a message passing system, and the main calls made its programs are Send() and Receive(). Messages are short, including only 24 bytes of user data, and sent asynchronously. To find the appropriate endpoint, its name server allows the applications to bind their names to their task IDs, allowing them to move in the system and be found dynamically. The OS has several routines for finding, starting, and stopping tasks on other cards, one of which is a virtual card representing the host computer.

To coordinate communications and provide a mechanism for talking with the host's CPU, a cut-down copy of A/ROSE also runs inside the Mac OS in the form of a system extension, or "INIT", known as "Prep". Device drivers for A/ROSE cards are INITs and started up automatically. After starting, they find the Prep stub and use the normal A/ROSE communications channel it provides to communicate with the cards.

For instance, the Apple TokenTalk NB card installs its driver as an INIT, and optionally installs the Prep stub, assuming it had not been installed before. On startup the driver finds the Prep stub and asks it to enumerate the TokenTalk cards installed in the machine, and optionally uploads code or settings to them. From that point on, Prep handles the communications with the card, handing off the results to the TokenTalk driver.
