= Chip creep =

Phenomenon of chips moving out sockets

Chip creep refers to the problem of an integrated circuit (chip) working its way out of its socket over time. This was mainly an issue in early PCs.

Chip creep occurs due to thermal expansion, which is expansion and contraction as the system heats up and cools down. It can also occur due to vibration. While chip creep was most common with older memory modules, it was also a problem with CPUs and other main chips that were inserted into sockets. An example is the Apple III, where its CPU would be dislodged and the user would need to reseat the chip.

To fix chip creep, users of older systems would often have to remove the case cover and push the loose chip back into the socket. Today's computer systems are not as affected by chip creep, since chips are more securely held, either by various types of retainer clips or by being soldered into place, and since system cooling has improved.
