= MkLinux =

Computer operating system

- Developer: OSF Research Institute, Apple Computer, MkLinux Developers Association, volunteer community
- Written in: C
- OS family: Macintosh, Linux (Unix-like)
- Working state: Discontinued, legacy
- Source model: Open source
- Initial release: February 1996; 30 years ago
- Final release: Pre-R2 / August 5, 2002; 24 years ago
- Marketing target: Researchers, hobbyists
- Available in: English
- Package manager: RPM
- Supported platforms: PowerPC
- Kernel type: Microkernel (Mach 3.0)
- Userland: Red Hat Linux
- Default user interface: Console, X11
- License: GNU General Public License
- Preceded by: Mach, Linux
- Succeeded by: macOS, Darwin, Linux
- Official website: mklinux.org

MkLinux (Microkernel Linux) is a discontinued open-source experimental operating system for PowerPC Macintosh computers. It was launched in 1995 as a collaboration between the Open Software Foundation (OSF) and Apple Computer, as a critical pivot in Apple's technical and social history. MkLinux became Apple's first official free and open-source software community project, and the debut of Linux on the first Power Macintosh.

MkLinux's key feature is its microkernel architecture. Most Linux distributions have a monolithic kernel, but MkLinux is distinguished by its architecture which adapted the Linux kernel to run as a user-space server hosted on top of the Mach microkernel version 3.0. This "single server" architecture makes the system stable and easier to debug, but the overhead of communicating with the microkernel reduces performance.

Reception was mixed, focusing on the difficult installation process and the significant performance costs of the Mach kernel. Reviewers noted its potential as a "Unix killer", but that it required users to abandon the user-friendly Macintosh experience for a pure Linux environment. The microkernel's additional technical complexity made tasks like kernel recompilation more difficult compared to standard Linux distributions.

MkLinux was succeeded in the Linux community by the monolithic LinuxPPC. Through the MkLinux alliance, OSF and Apple eventually created the technical substrate necessary to also port the Mach-based XNU kernel to Macintosh. Apple finally resolved its decade-long operating system debacle by adopting the XNU-based NeXTSTEP (codenamed Rhapsody) as the future of macOS.

== Architecture ==
MkLinux adapts the Linux operating system to run as a server hosted atop the Mach microkernel version 3.0. In this "single server" model, the Mach microkernel handles the low-level hardware abstraction, memory management, and inter-process communication (IPC). The Linux kernel functionality—including file systems, networking, and process management—operates as a separate server task.

This design contrasts with the hybrid XNU kernel in the later macOS, where the BSD and Mach components run together in the same kernel address space. The MkLinux architecture allows the operating system to be debugged as a standard user process and improves stability. However, this separation introduces a performance penalty; the context switching required between the Mach microkernel and the Linux server to handle system calls creates overhead.

== History ==
The MkLinux project began in August 1995 as a sponsorship between Apple Computer and the Open Software Foundation (OSF) Research Institute. The goal was to port "Linux on Mach" to the Power Macintosh, allowing Apple to explore kernel technology alternatives. Apple's operating system strategy of the preceding decade was an ongoing infamous failure (mainly A/UX, Pink, and Copland), and its current flagship was the legacy Mac OS. There was not yet an official port of Linux for any PowerPC (launched the previous year) nor for any Macintosh. The OSF Institute, owner of the Mach microkernel, was interested in promoting Mach on various platforms. Apple VP of Development Tools Ike Nassi and Brett Halle directed the effort, and development later was split between Michael Burg at Apple in Cupertino, California, and Nick Stephen at the OSF in Grenoble, France.

MkLinux was officially announced at the 1996 World Wide Developers Conference (WWDC), where attendees received a free CD containing a binary distribution. In mid-1998, the community-led MkLinux Developers Association took over development. Due to the large size of the software distribution, which was difficult to download via contemporary dial-up Internet access, official CDs were distributed in books published by Prime Time Freeware in English and Japanese.

Following the release of Open Firmware-based Power Macintosh computers, the LinuxPPC project created an official PowerPC branch of the Linux kernel. MkLinux and LinuxPPC developers exchanged ideas, as the two projects diverged in hardware support and performance. MkLinux provides greater hardware compatibility, supporting both older NuBus and newer PCI Macintosh systems, whereas LinuxPPC initially supported only PCI-based machines. However, MkLinux suffers a performance cost relative to LinuxPPC due to the overhead of the Mach kernel.

After Apple ceased direct support for MkLinux, the developer community struggled to maintain the Mach kernel and support various Power Macintosh models. MkLinux remained the only Linux option for Macintosh NuBus computers until the release of PPC/Linux for NuBus in June 2000.

== Reception ==
The critical reception of MkLinux focused on its stability and the steep learning curve required for Macintosh users. MacTech magazine noted in 1999 that MkLinux failed to displace commercial Unix, but it pushed the classic Mac OS toward more robust memory management. The installation process was characterized as inconsistent, described as "either smooth as silk or very, very rough" depending on the user's specific hardware configuration.

Reviewers also highlighted the difficulty of maintaining the operating system compared to standard Linux distributions. Specifically, recompiling the kernel was noted to be "slightly more difficult" due to the additional steps required to synchronize with the Mach microkernel. The OS has a functional desktop suite, but critics observed that adopting MkLinux required users to forgo the traditional novice-focused Macintosh experience in favor of a standard, command-line centric, Unix environment.

== Legacy ==
MkLinux represented Apple's first official attempt to support a free and open-source software project. The work done with the Mach 3.0 kernel in MkLinux assisted the initial porting of NeXTSTEP to the Macintosh hardware platform, which evolved into macOS.

OS X is based on the Mach 3.0 microkernel, designed by Carnegie Mellon University, and later adapted to the Power Macintosh by Apple and the Open Software Foundation Research Institute (now part of Silicomp). This was known as osfmk, and was part of MkLinux (https://www.mklinux.org). Later, this and code from OSF's commercial development efforts were incorporated into Darwin’s kernel.

— Apple, Inc., Kernel Programming Guide: Mach API Reference

== Releases ==
Version	Approx. date	Notes
DR1	May 1996	Linux 1.3
DR2	September 1996	Many bug fixes
DR2.1	May 1997	Linux 2.0; support for PCI machines
DR3	July 1998	
R1	December 1999	
Pre-R2	August 2002	

== See also ==
- L4Linux
- Workplace OS
