= Apple GS/OS =

Apple IIGS operating system

GS/OS
- The IIGS Finder running within GS/OS
- Developer: Apple Computer
- OS family: GS/OS
- Working state: Historic
- Source model: Closed source
- Initial release: 1988; 37 years ago
- Latest release: GS/OS v4.02 (System Software 6.0.1) / May 6, 1993; 31 years ago
- Kernel type: Monolithic kernel
- License: Apple Software License Agreement

GS/OS is an operating system developed by Apple Computer for its Apple IIGS personal computer. It provides facilities for accessing the file system, controlling input/output devices, loading and running program files, and a system allowing programs to handle interrupts and signals. It uses ProDOS as its primary filing system. GS/OS is a component of Apple IIGS System Software versions 4.0 through 6.0.1, and was the first true 16-bit operating system for the IIGS.

== Features ==
=== Speed optimization ===
The advantage of GS/OS over its predecessor, the ProDOS 16 operating system, is that it was written entirely in 16-bit code for the 65816 processor used in the IIGS, rather than primarily in 8-bit 6502 machine code that does not take advantage of the IIGS's unique features. This in turn allows GS/OS to offer vast speed optimizations (loading time, disk access, screen updates) compared with the previous OS, and provided room to incorporate many features of other Apple operating systems, including Apple III Apple SOS, the Macintosh System 5, as well as concepts and features that would later appear in future Macintosh System Software releases (e.g. proportional scrollbars, thermometer progress bars).

=== New features and enhancements ===
In addition to continued enhancements to the IIGS Finder and loadable fonts, GS/OS offered plug-in device drivers (modem, printer, etc.), a thermometer progress display, AppleShare support, File System Translators for accessing foreign file formats, disk caching and support for storage devices up to 4 Gigabytes. It also extends the ProDOS file system to provide for resource forks on files similar to those used on the Apple Macintosh, which allows for programs to be written in a more flexible way. The newly included Apple Advanced Disk Utilities and Apple IIGS Installer helped facilitate partitioning, formatting and installing software and drivers with visual ease. A command-line development environment called APW (Apple Programmer's Workshop) is available; much like the Macintosh Programmer's Workshop.

==== File System Translators ====
GS/OS includes a facility known as file system translators (FSTs) which allows it to support multiple on-disk file systems in a manner transparent to application programs and to the user, a feature not found in ProDOS or most other microcomputer operating systems at the time. While GS/OS natively uses the ProDOS file system (from which it must be booted), it also fully supports HFS used by Mac OS. Other file system translators include those for the MS-DOS FAT file system, High Sierra/ISO 9660, Apple DOS 3.3, and Apple Pascal, albeit read-only (full read/write support had been planned but was never completed).

== Releases ==
=== ProDOS 16 (GS/OS predecessor) ===
- 1986 – System 1.0 (ProDOS 16 v1.0), System 1.1 (ProDOS 16 v1.1)
- 1987 – System 2.0 (ProDOS 16 v1.2), System 3.1 (ProDOS 16 v1.3)
- 1988 – System 3.2 (ProDOS 16 v1.6)

=== GS/OS ===
- 1988 – System 4.0 (GS/OS v2.0)
- 1989 – System 5.0 (GS/OS v3.0), System 5.0.1 (GS/OS v3.0), System 5.0.2 (GS/OS v3.0)
- 1990 – System 5.0.3 (GS/OS v3.03)
- 1991 – System 5.0.4 (GS/OS v3.03)
- 1992 – System 6.0 (GS/OS v4.01)
- 1993 – System 6.0.1 (GS/OS v4.02)

=== Unofficial versions ===
- 2015 – System 6.0.2 (GS/OS v4.02), System 6.0.3 (GS/OS v4.02)
- 2017 – System 6.0.4 (GS/OS v4.02)

== See also ==
- Macintosh Finder
