= Macintosh Application Environment =

1994 application by Apple

The Macintosh Application Environment (MAE) is a software package introduced by Apple Computer in 1994 that allows certain Unix-based computer workstations to run System 7 and its application software.

== Overview ==
MAE uses the X Window System to provide the Macintosh Finder graphical user interface in a window.

MAE 1.0 was launched in 1994 for SPARC-based systems running Solaris 2.3 and PA-RISC-based systems running HP-UX 9.0, at US$549 (equivalent to $1,200 in 2024). It features a special version of System 7.1 with its integrated MultiFinder environment, running on an emulated 68LC040 CPU (which lacks floating-point support). Up to 70% of host RAM can be allocated to MAE using its customized Memory control panel. The custom environment omits support for some Macintosh functionality, such as QuickTime, sound, serial, networking, and hardware drivers within CDEVs and INITs. Host integration was introduced to compensate, with the host system's storage, including floppy and CD-ROM drives, being available to Macintosh applications. Files within the emulated environment are stored in the host's filesystem. Clipboard integration permits textual and graphical copying and pasting between the Macintosh and X Window System environments.

MAE includes a license manager, allowing floating network licenses.

The final version of 3.0 provides System 7.5.3, and runs on Solaris 2.5 and later and HP-UX 9.05 or 10.10. MAE was discontinued on May 14, 1998.

== Reception ==
Reviewed as an "impressive piece of work" in 1994 by Open Systems Today magazine, MAE 1.0's performance on a SPARCclassic workstation with 32 MB of RAM was "sluggish" with screen redraws "slower than a Mac Plus", but higher-end workstations have performance comparable to a Macintosh IIci.

== See also ==
- Classic (Mac OS X)
- Wabi (software)
- Solaris OpenStep
- A/UX
