= Apple III =

1980 business-oriented personal computer

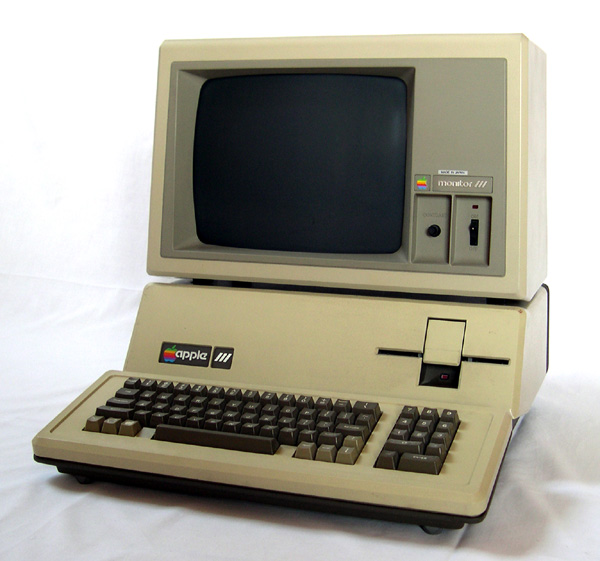
- Developer: Apple Computer
- Released: November 1980; 45 years ago
- Introductory price: US$4,340 – $7,800 (equivalent to $16,960 – $30,480 in 2025)
- Discontinued: April 24, 1984; 42 years ago
- Units sold: 120,000
- Operating system: Apple SOS
- CPU: Synertek 6502 @ 1.8 MHz
- Memory: 128 KB RAM, expandable to 512 KB
- Removable storage: 5 1/4 inch floppy disk
- Display: 80 × 24 text; 560 × 192 pixels (monochrome); 280 × 192 pixels (16 colors or grayscale)
- Sound: 6-bit DAC
- Predecessor: Apple II
- Successor: Apple III Plus

The Apple III (stylized as apple ///) is a business-oriented personal computer that was produced by Apple Computer and released in 1980. It was intended as the successor to the Apple II with features business users wanted—a full typewriter-style keyboard with upper and lowercase letters, multi-directional cursor keys and an 80-column display—but it failed in the market. It uses Apple's proprietary Sophisticated Operating System (SOS).

Designed by Wendell Sander, the Apple III was announced on May 19, 1980, and released in late November that year. Serious stability issues required a design overhaul and a recall of the first 14,000 machines produced. It was formally reintroduced on November 9, 1981, but damage to the computer's reputation had already been done. An updated version was released in December 1983 as the Apple III Plus.

An estimated 75,000 Apple III computers were sold. The Apple III Plus brought this up to approximately 120,000. The original model was discontinued on April 24, 1984, and the Plus in September 1985. The III's failure led Apple to reevaluate its plan to phase out the Apple II, and later Apple II models incorporate some technologies of the Apple III. Steve Wozniak stated that the primary reason for the Apple III's failure was that the system was designed by Apple's marketing department, unlike Apple's previous engineering-driven projects.

== Overview ==
=== Design ===
Steve Wozniak and Steve Jobs expected hobbyists to purchase the Apple II, but the introduction of VisiCalc and Disk II helped attract small businesses, which purchased 90% of the computers.

Apple designed the Apple III to be a business computer and successor to the Apple II. Although the Apple II had spurred the creation of business software such as VisiCalc, Multiplan, and Apple Writer, its hardware architecture, operating system, and development environment imposed limitations on software programming.

Apple management also sought to establish clear market segmentation by targeting the larger business market with the Apple III, while retaining the Apple II as a less expensive option for home and education users. Wozniak later recalled management's expectation that "once the Apple III was out, the Apple II would stop selling in six months".

The Apple III used a 2 MHz Synertek 6502A or 6502B 8-bit CPU. Video and memory refresh cycles reduced its effective operating speed to between 1.4 and 1.8 MHz. Like some later Apple II models, the Apple III used bank switching to address memory beyond the 6502's standard 64 KB limit, supporting up to 256 KB of RAM. Third-party vendors offered memory upgrades that increased capacity to as much as 512 KB.

The Apple III included an 80-column, 24-line display with uppercase and lowercase characters, a numeric keypad, pressure-sensitive cursor-control keys with two operating speeds, 6-bit audio output through a DAC, and a built-in 140 KB 5.25-inch floppy disk drive. Its graphics modes supported a 560 × 192 monochrome display or a 280 × 192 display with 16 colors or shades of gray. Unlike earlier Apple II models, the Apple III integrated the Disk III controller into its logic board.

The Apple III allowed users to select a screen font and choose between the QWERTY and Dvorak keyboard layouts. These settings could not be changed while a program was running. By contrast, the Apple IIc included a keyboard switch above the keyboard that allowed users to change keyboard layouts without restarting a program.

=== Software ===
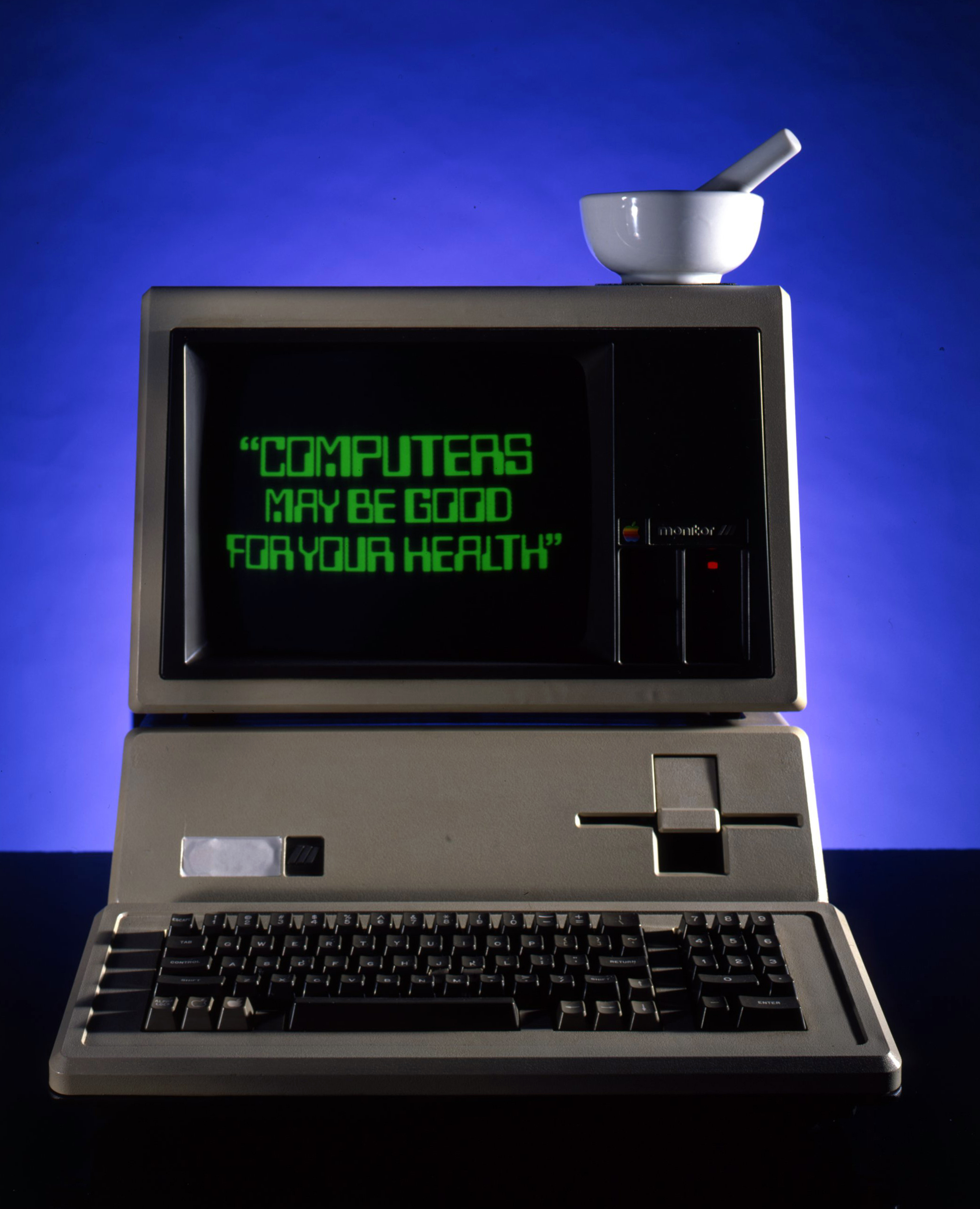
An advertisement for access to health information through the Apple III

The Apple III introduced an advanced operating system called Apple SOS, pronounced "apple sauce". Its ability to address resources by name allows the Apple III to be more scalable than the Apple II's addressing by physical location such as PR#6 and CATALOG, D1. Apple SOS allows the full capacity of a storage device to be used as a single volume, such as the Apple ProFile hard disk drive, and it supports a hierarchical file system. Some of the features and code base of Apple SOS were later adopted into the Apple II's ProDOS and GS/OS operating systems, as well as Lisa 7/7 and Mac OS.

With a starting price of $4,340 (equivalent to $17,356 as of 2024) and a maximum price of $7,800 (equivalent to $31,194 as of 2024), the Apple III was more expensive than many of the CP/M-based business computers that were available at the time. Few software applications other than VisiCalc are available for the computer; according to a presentation at KansasFest 2012, fewer than 50 Apple III-specific software packages were ever published, most shipping when the III Plus was released. However this number is proven to be wildly incorrect, given the manual 'RESOURCE GUIDE: Of Apple /// and Apple /// Plus Software and Hardware' published and released by Apple Computer, Inc. in May 1984 lists in excess of 500+ software packages produced by many and varied publishers. Given software publishers and specialised hardware manufacturers such as On-Three, Inc. produced products for the Apple III well in to the late 90s, in excess of 500 products can also be seen as way too conservative.

Because Apple did not view the Apple III as suitable for hobbyists, it did not provide much of the technical software information that accompanies the Apple II. Originally intended as a direct replacement to the Apple II, it was designed to be backward compatible with Apple II software. However, since Apple did not want to encourage continued development of the II platform, Apple II compatibility exists only in a special Apple II Mode which is limited in its capabilities to the emulation of a basic Apple II Plus configuration with 48 kB of RAM.

Special chips were intentionally added to prevent access from Apple II Mode to the III's advanced features such as its larger amount of memory.

=== Peripherals ===
The Apple III has four expansion slots, a number that inCider in 1986 called "miserly", also saying Apple II cards are compatible but risk violating government RFI regulations, and require Apple III-specific device drivers; BYTE stated that "Apple provides virtually no information on how to write them". As with software, Apple provided little hardware technical information with the computer but Apple III-specific products became available, such as one that made the computer compatible with the Apple IIe. Several new Apple-produced peripherals were developed for the Apple III. The original Apple III has a built-in real-time clock, which is recognized by Apple SOS. The clock was later removed from the "revised" model, and was instead made available as an add-on.

Along with the built-in floppy drive, the Apple III can also handle up to three additional external Disk III floppy disk drives. The Disk III is only officially compatible with the Apple III. The Apple III Plus requires an adaptor from Apple to use the Disk III with its DB-25 disk port.

With the introduction of the revised Apple III a year after launch, Apple began offering the ProFile external hard disk system. Priced at $3,499 for 5 MB of storage, it also required a peripheral slot for its controller card.

=== Backward compatibility ===
The Apple III has the built-in hardware capability to run Apple II software. In order to do so, an emulation boot disk is required that functionally turns the machine into a standard 48-kilobyte Apple II Plus, until it is powered off. The keyboard, internal floppy drive (and one external Disk III), display (color is provided through the 'B/W video' port) and speaker all act as Apple II peripherals. The paddle and serial ports can also function in Apple II mode, however with some limitations and compatibility issues.

Apple engineers added specialized circuitry with the sole purpose of blocking access to its advanced features when running in Apple II emulation mode. This was done primarily to discourage further development and interest in the Apple II line, and to push the Apple III as its successor. For example, no more than 48 KB of RAM can be accessed, even if the machine has 128 KB of RAM or higher present. Many Apple II programs require a minimum of 64 KB of RAM, making them impossible to run on the Apple III. Similarly, access to lowercase support, 80 columns text, or its more advanced graphics and sound are blocked by this hardware circuitry, making it impossible for even skilled software programmers to bypass Apple's lockout. A third-party company, Titan Technologies, sold an expansion board called the III Plus II that allows Apple II mode to access more memory, a standard game port, and with a later released companion card, even emulate the Apple IIe.

Certain Apple II slot cards can be installed in the Apple III and used in native III-mode with custom written SOS device drivers, including Grappler Plus and Liron 3.5 Controller.

=== Revisions ===
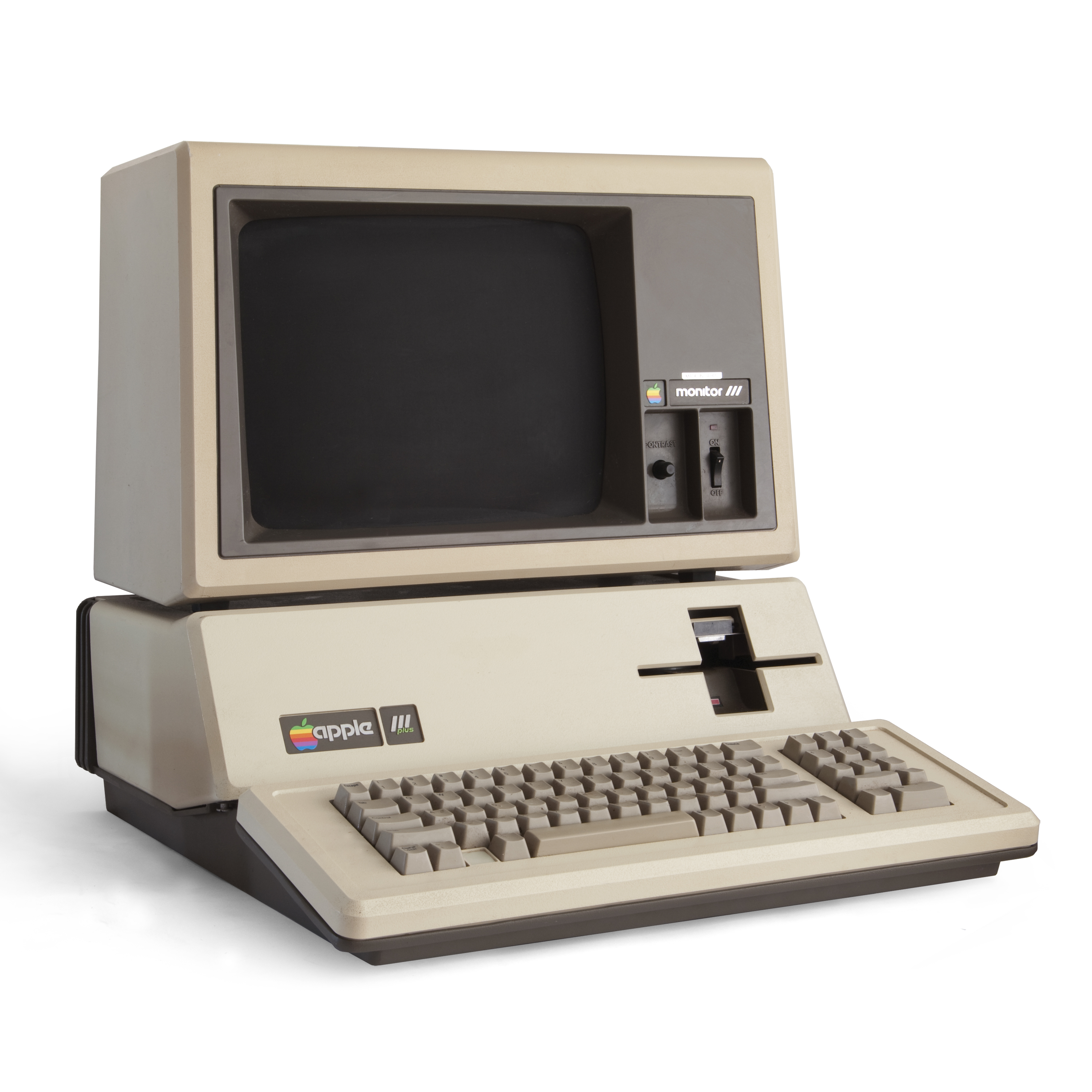
Apple III Plus

After overheating issues were attributed to serious design flaws, a redesigned logic board was introduced in mid-December 1981 – which included a lower power supply requirement, wider circuit traces and better-designed chip sockets. The $3,495 revised model also includes 256 KB of RAM as the standard configuration. The 14,000 units of the original Apple III sold were returned and replaced with the entirely new revised model.

==== Apple III Plus ====
Apple discontinued the III in October 1983 because it violated FCC regulations, and the FCC required the company to change the redesigned computer's name. It introduced the Apple III Plus in December 1983 at a price of US$2,995. This newer version includes a built-in clock, video interlacing, standardized rear port connectors, 55-watt power supply, 256 KB of RAM as standard, and a redesigned, Apple IIe-like keyboard.

Owners of the Apple III could purchase individual III Plus upgrades, like the clock and interlacing feature, and obtain the newer logic board as a service replacement. A keyboard upgrade kit, dubbed "Apple III Plus upgrade kit" was also made available – which included the keyboard, cover, keyboard encoder ROM, and logo replacements. This upgrade had to be installed by an authorized service technician.

== Design flaws ==
According to Wozniak, the Apple III "had 100 percent hardware failures". Former Apple executive Taylor Pohlman stated that:

There was way too short a time frame in manufacturing and development. When the decision was made to announce, there were only three Apple IIIs in existence, and they were all wire-wrapped boards.

The case of the Apple III had long since been set in concrete, so they had a certain size logic board to fit the circuits on ... They went to three different outside houses and nobody could get a layout that would fit on the board.

They used the smallest line circuit boards that could be used. They ran about 1,000 of these boards as preproduction units to give to the dealers as demonstration units. They really didn't work ... Apple swapped out the boards. The problem was, at this point there were other problems, things like chips that didn't fit. There were a million problems that you would normally take care of when you do your preproduction and pilot run. Basically, customers were shipped the pilot run.

Jobs insisted on the idea of having no fan or air vents, in order to make the computer run quietly. He would later push this same ideology onto almost all Apple models he had control of, from the Apple Lisa and Macintosh 128K to the iMac. To allow the computer to dissipate heat, the base of the Apple III was made of heavy cast aluminum, which supposedly acts as a heat sink. One advantage to the aluminum case was a reduction in radio frequency interference, a problem which had plagued the Apple II series throughout its history. Unlike the Apple II, the power supply was mounted – without its own shell – in a compartment separate from the logic board. The decision to use an aluminum shell ultimately led to engineering issues which resulted in the Apple III's reliability problems. The lead time for manufacturing the shells was high, and this had to be done before the motherboard was finalized. Later, it was realized that there was not enough room on the motherboard for all of the components unless narrow traces were used.

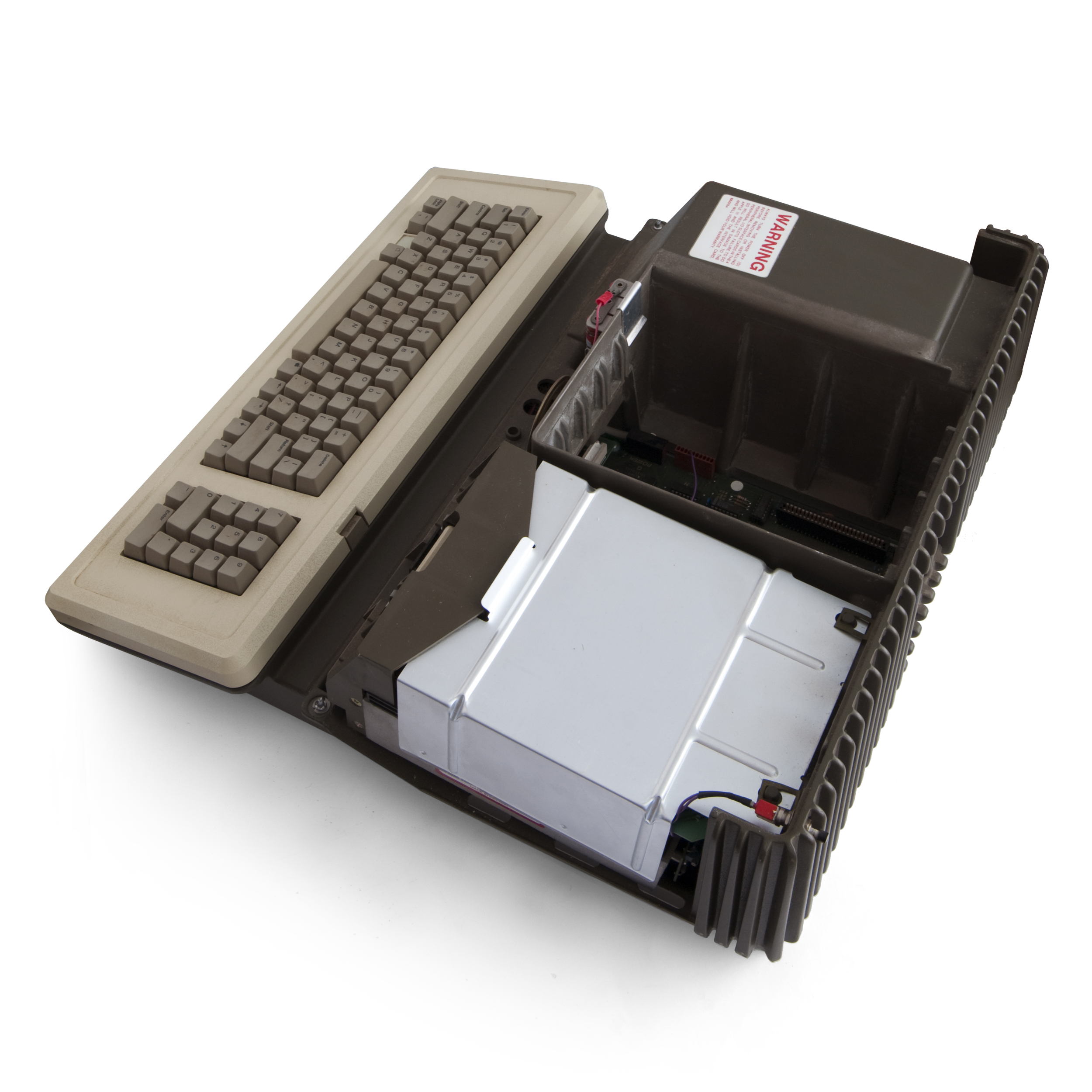
Apple III Plus showing the RFI shield over the floppy drive and the cast aluminum case

Many Apple IIIs were thought to have failed due to their inability to properly dissipate heat. inCider stated in 1986 that "Heat has always been a formidable enemy of the Apple ///", and some users reported that their Apple IIIs became so hot that the chips started dislodging from the board, causing the screen to display garbled data or their disk to come out of the slot "melted". BYTE wrote, "the integrated circuits tended to wander out of their sockets". It has been rumored Apple advised customers to tilt the front of the Apple III six inches above the desk and then drop it to reseat the chips as a temporary solution. Other analyses blame a faulty automatic chip insertion process, not heat.

Case designer Jerry Manock denied the design flaw charges, insisting that tests proved that the unit adequately dissipated the internal heat. The primary cause, he claimed, was a major logic board design problem. The logic board used "fineline" technology that was not fully mature at the time, with narrow, closely spaced traces. When chips were "stuffed" into the board and wave-soldered, solder bridges would form between traces that were not supposed to be connected. This caused numerous short circuits, which required hours of costly diagnosis and hand rework to fix. Apple designed a new circuit board with more layers and normal-width traces. The new logic board was laid out by one designer on a huge drafting board, rather than using the costly CAD-CAM system used for the previous board, and the new design worked.

Earlier Apple III units came with a built-in real time clock. The hardware, however, would fail after prolonged use. Assuming that National Semiconductor would test all parts before shipping them, Apple did not perform this level of testing. Apple was soldering chips directly to boards and could not easily replace a bad chip if one was found. Eventually, Apple solved this problem by removing the real-time clock from the Apple III's specification rather than shipping the Apple III with the clock pre-installed, and then sold the peripheral as a level 1 technician add-on.

== BASIC ==
Microsoft and Apple each developed their own versions of BASIC for the Apple III. Apple III Microsoft BASIC was designed to run on the CP/M platform available for the Apple III. Apple Business BASIC shipped with the Apple III. Donn Denman ported Applesoft BASIC to SOS and reworked it to take advantage of the extended memory of the Apple III.

Both languages introduced a number of new or improved features over Applesoft BASIC. Both languages replaced Applesoft's single-precision floating-point variables using 5-byte storage with the somewhat-reduced-precision 4-byte variables, while also adding a larger numerical format. Apple III Microsoft BASIC provides double-precision floating-point variables, taking 8 bytes of storage, while Apple Business BASIC offers an extra-long integer type, also taking 8 bytes for storage. Both languages also retain 2-byte integers, and maximum 255-character strings.

Other new features common to both languages include:

- Incorporation of disk-file commands within the language.
- Operators for MOD and for integer-division.
- An optional ELSE clause in IF...THEN statements.
- HEX$() function for hexadecimal-format output.
- INSTR function for finding a substring within a string.
- PRINT USING statement to control format of output. Apple Business BASIC had an option, in addition to directly specifying the format with a string expression, of giving the line number where an IMAGE statement gave the formatting expression, similar to a FORMAT statement in FORTRAN.

Some features work differently in each language:

	Apple III Microsoft BASIC	Apple Business BASIC
integer division operator	\ (backslash)	DIV
reading the keyboard without waiting	INKEY$ function returns a one-character string representing the last key pressed, or the null string if no new key pressed since last reading	KBD read-only "reserved variable" returns the ASCII code of the last key pressed; the manual fails to document what is returned if no new key pressed since last reading
reassigning a portion of a string variable	MID$() assignment statement	SUB$() assignment statement
determining position of text output	POS() function to read horizontal screen position, and LPOS() function to read horizontal position on printer	HPOS and VPOS assignable "reserved variables" to read or set the horizontal or vertical position for text screen output
accepting hexadecimal-format values	"&H"-formatted expressions	TEN() function to give numerical value from string representing hexadecimal
result of ASC("") (null string operand)	causes an error	returns the value −1

=== Microsoft BASIC additional features ===
- INPUT$() function to replace Applesoft's GET command.
- LINE INPUT statement to input an entire line of text, regardless of punctuation, into a single string variable.
- LPRINT and LPRINT USING statements to automatically direct output to paper.
- LSET and RSET statements to left- or right-justify a string expression within a given string variable's character length.
- OCT$() function for output, and "&"- or "&O"-formatted expressions, for manipulating octal notation.
- SPACE$() function for generating blank spaces outside of a PRINT statement, and STRING$() function to do likewise with any character.
- WHILE...WEND statements, for loop structures built on general Boolean conditions without an index variable.
- Bitwise Boolean (16-bit) operations (AND, OR, NOT), with additional operators XOR, EQV, IMP.
- Line number specification in the RESTORE command.
- RESUME options of NEXT (to skip to the statement after that which caused the error) or a specified line number (which replaces the idea of exiting error-handling by GOTO-line, thus avoiding Applesoft II's stack error problem).
- Multiple parameters in user-defined (DEF FN) functions.
- A return to the old Applesoft One concept of having multiple USR() functions at different addresses, by establishing ten different USR functions, numbered USR0 to USR9, with separate DEF USRx statements to define the address of each. The argument passed to a USRx function can be of any specific type, including string. The returned value can also be of any type, by default the same type as the argument passed.

There is no support for graphics provided within the language, nor for reading analog controls or buttons; nor is there a means of defining the active window of the text screen.

=== Business BASIC additional features ===
Apple Business BASIC eliminates all references to absolute memory addresses. Thus, the POKE command and PEEK() function were not included in the language, and new features replaced the CALL statement and USR() function. The functionality of certain features in Applesoft that had been achieved with various PEEK and POKE locations is now provided by:

- BUTTON() function to read game-controller buttons
- WINDOW statement to define the active window of the text screen by its coordinates
- KBD, HPOS, and VPOS system variables

External binary subroutines and functions are loaded into memory by a single INVOKE disk-command that loads separately-assembled code modules. A PERFORM statement is then used to call an INVOKEd procedure by name, with an argument-list. INVOKEd functions would be referenced in expressions by EXFN. (floating-point) or EXFN%. (integer), with the function name appended, plus the argument-list for the function.

Graphics are supported with an INVOKEd module, with features including displaying text within graphics in various fonts, within four different graphics modes available on the Apple III.

== Reception ==
It was unfortunate the way things worked out, because we probably put $100 million in advertising, promotion, and research and development into a product that was 3 percent of our revenues. In that same time frame, think what we could have done to improve the Apple II, or how much could have been done by Apple to give us products in IBM's market.

— Steve Wozniak, 1985

"The Apple III is unlikely to approach the success of the Apple II", InfoWorld said in January 1981. Citing the III's high price, manufacturing delays, limited disk storage, and small software library, the magazine asked "why buy a $5000 computer with an emulator when most of the programs you need run directly on a $2500 computer".

Despite devoting the majority of its R&D to the Apple III and so ignoring the II that for a while dealers had difficulty in obtaining the latter, the III's technical problems made marketing the computer difficult. Ed Smith, who after designing the APF Imagination Machine worked as a distributor's representative, described the III as "a complete disaster". He recalled that he "was responsible for going to every dealership, setting up the Apple III in their showroom, and then explaining to them the functions of the Apple III, which in many cases didn't really work".

=== Sales ===
BYTE reported in 1982 that Apple had sold only 10,000 of the original Apple III, compared to 350,000 Apple IIs sold by the end of 1981. Pohlman reported that Apple was only selling 500 units a month by late 1981, mostly as replacements. The company was able to eventually raise monthly sales to 5,000, but the IBM PC's successful launch had encouraged software companies to develop for it instead, prompting Apple to shift focus to the Lisa and Macintosh. The PC almost ended sales of the Apple III, the most closely comparable Apple computer model. IIe sales rose in late 1983 and early 1984 despite its circa-1977 technology; by contrast, III sales were primarily to existing III owners, Apple itself—its 4,500 employees were equipped with some 3,000-4,500 units—and some small businesses. After selling about 75,000 units, and replacing 14,000 defective units, Apple discontinued the III series on April 24, 1984, four months after introducing the III Plus.

Jobs said the company lost "incalculable amounts" of money on the Apple III. Wozniak estimated that Apple had spent $100 million on the III instead of improving the II and better competing against IBM. Pohlman claimed that there was a "stigma" at Apple associated with having contributed to the computer. Most employees who worked on the III reportedly left Apple.

== Legacy ==
Some design ideas, including the file system from the Apple III's operating system, Apple SOS, were influential. Apple SOS's file system was incorporated into Apple ProDOS and Apple GS/OS (the main operating systems for the Apple II following the demise of the Apple III) as well as the Apple Lisa (the de facto business-oriented successor to the Apple III). The Apple III introduced the hierarchical file system which influenced the evolution of the Macintosh: the original Macintosh File System (MFS) was a flat file system without subdirectories, designed for a floppy disk; all subsequent file systems were hierarchical. By comparison, the IBM PC's first file system was originally designed as a flat file system for floppy disks, only later extended to support folder hierarchy with MS-DOS 2.0 in 1983.

=== In popular culture ===
At the start of the Walt Disney Pictures film Tron, lead character Kevin Flynn (played by Jeff Bridges) is seen hacking into the ENCOM mainframe using an Apple III.

Timeline of Apple II family
See also: Timeline of the Apple II series, Timeline of Macintosh models, and Timeline of Apple Inc. products
