= Disk First Aid =

Deprecated Apple utility software

- Developer: Apple Inc.
- Stable release: 8.6.1 / May 3, 2001; 25 years ago
- Operating system: Classic Mac OS
- Type: software utility
- Website: support.apple.com/kb/TA26794

Disk First Aid is a free software utility made by Apple Inc. that was bundled with all computers running the classic Mac OS. This tool verifies and repairs a limited number of directory structure problems on any HFS or HFS Plus hard disk or volume.

Disk First Aid is a very simple tool, with it only being able to detect and repair directory damage and many books are critical of its sometimes inaccurate reporting of errors, and often suggest to run the tool more than once to ensure a consistent result. Disk First Aid is located in Applications:Utilities:Disk First Aid. The classic Mac OS provides an option to run Disk First Aid on startup, although it has been reported that it provides little gain and sometimes can amplify a problem.

Its capabilities were incorporated into Disk Utility in macOS.

== Situations to use the tool ==
One source suggests that disk utility should be used when there are:

- Frequent system crashes,
- Disappearing files,
- Files changing size,
- Problems copying files from one place to another,
- Problems saving files,
- Cryptic error messages,

as well as for general maintenance every 6 months.

== Analysis ==
Disk First Aid has built-in capabilities to check for damage to:

- Partition Map,
- Device Driver,
- Boot Blocks,
- Master Directory Block,
- Volume Bitmap,
- Catalog File,
- Extents File,
- Finder Attributes,
- Disk volume,
- Extent B-tree,
- Catalog B-tree,
- Catalog Hierarchy,
- Volume Info,
- and to search for locked volume name.

After analyzing the disk directory, Disk First Aid determines whether it is able to repair any damage that was detected. The utility can commonly only fix problems associated with the catalog/extents files and the volume bitmap. Commonly, the program reports that there is an error, but cannot fix it.

== See also ==
- List of data recovery software
