= Macintosh file system =

These file systems have been the default file system of the Apple Macintosh:

- The Macintosh File System or MFS, 1984–1985, full support discontinued with System 7.6.1
- The Hierarchical File System or HFS, 1985 until the release of Mac OS X, was still in 2007, but as of Mac OS X 10.6 only as read-only
- The Hierarchical File System Plus or HFS+, released 1998, default since Mac OS X, until APFS replaced
- Apple File System (APFS), released in 2017, default since macOS High Sierra
