= Apple Partition Map =

Computer disk partitioning standard for legacy Macintosh computers

Apple Partition Map (APM) is a partition scheme used to define the low-level organization of data on disks formatted for use with 68k and PowerPC Macintosh computers. It was introduced with the Macintosh II.

Disks using the Apple Partition Map are divided into logical blocks, with 512 bytes usually belonging to each block. The first block, Block 0, contains an Apple-specific data structure called "Driver Descriptor Map" for the Macintosh Toolbox ROM to load driver updates and patches before loading from an MFS or HFS partition. Because APM allows 32 bits worth of logical blocks, the historical size of an APM formatted disk using small blocks is limited to 2 TiB.

The Apple Partition Map maps out all space used (including the map) and unused (free space) on disk, unlike the minimal x86 master boot record that only accounts for used non-map partitions. This means that every block on the disk (with the exception of the first block, Block 0) belongs to a partition.

Some hybrid disks contain both an ISO 9660 primary volume descriptor and an Apple Partition Map, thus allowing the disc to work on different types of computers, including Apple systems.

== Intel-based Macs ==
For accessing volumes, both APM and GPT partitions can be used in a standard manner with Mac OS X Tiger (10.4) and higher. For starting an operating system, PowerPC-based systems can only boot from APM disks. In contrast, Intel-based systems generally boot from GPT disks. Nevertheless, older Intel-based Macs are able to boot from APM, GPT (GUID Partition Table) and MBR (Master Boot Record, using the BIOS-Emulation called EFI-CSM i.e. the Compatibility Support Module provided by EFI).

Intel-based models that came with Mac OS X Tiger (10.4) or Leopard (10.5) preinstalled had to be able to boot from both APM and GPT disks due to the installation media for these universal versions of Mac OS X, which are APM partitioned in order to remain compatible with PowerPC-based systems. However, the installation of OS X on an Intel-based Mac demands a GPT partitioned disk or will refuse to continue, the same way installation on a PowerPC-based system will demand an APM partitioned destination volume. Cloning an already installed OS X to an APM partition on Intel systems will remain bootable even on 2011 Intel-based Macs. Despite this apparent APM support, Apple never officially supported booting from an internal APM disk on an Intel-based system. The one exception for a universal version of Mac OS X (Tiger or Leopard) is an official Apple document describing how to set up a dual bootable external APM disk for use with PowerPC and Intel.

== Layout ==
Each entry of the partition table is the size of one data block, which is normally 512 bytes. Each partition entry on the table is the size of one block or sector of data. Because the partition table itself is also a partition, the size of this first partition limits the number of entries to the partition table itself.

The normal case is that 64 sectors (64 × 512 = 32 KB) are used by the Apple Partition Map: one block for the Driver Descriptor Map as Block 0, one block for the partition table itself and 62 blocks for a maximum of 62 data partitions.

Each partition entry includes the starting sector and the size, as well as a name, a type, a position of the data area, and a possible boot code. It also includes the total number of partitions in that partition table. This ensures that, after reading the first partition table entry, the firmware is aware of how many blocks more to read from the media in order to process every partition table entry. All entries are in big-endian byte-order.

Address		Size in bytes	Contents	Required?
Decimal	Hex	Size in bytes	Contents	Required?
0	0x0000	1	signature1 (ASCII value "P")	No
1	0x0001	1	signature2 (ASCII value "M")	No
2–3	0x0002	2	reserved	No
4–7	0x0004	4	number of partitions (total)	Yes
8–11	0x0008	4	starting sector of partition	Yes
12–15	0x000C	4	size of partition (in sectors)	Yes
16–47	0x0010	32	name of partition (fixed ASCII right-side NULL padded)	No
48–79	0x0030	32	type of partition (fixed ASCII right-side NULL padded)	No
80–83	0x0050	4	starting sector of data area in partition	No
84–87	0x0054	4	size of data area in partition (in sectors)	No
88–91	0x0058	4	status of partition	No
92–95	0x005C	4	starting sector of boot code	No
96–99	0x0060	4	size of boot code (in bytes)	No
100–103	0x0064	4	address of bootloader code	No
104–107	0x0068	4	reserved	No
108–111	0x006C	4	boot code entry point	No
112–115	0x0070	4	reserved	No
116–119	0x0074	4	boot code checksum	No
120–135	0x0078	16	processor type (fixed ASCII right-side NULL padded)	No
136–511	0x0088	376	reserved	No

== Partition identifiers ==
Types beginning with "Apple_" are reserved for assignment by Apple, all other custom defined types are free to use. However registration with Apple is encouraged.

Identifier / type	Contents / file system	Name (typical)	Remarks
Apple_Boot	bootloader	MOSX_OF3_Booter, eXternal booter	This boot partition is used by Mac OS X on New World Macs (Open Firmware 3.0 and greater) when the file system on the main partition is not supported by Open Firmware, like in a software RAID configuration or when using a HFS+ case-sensitive or a UFS file system. It contains BootX on an HFS filesystem.
Apple_Boot_RAID	bootloader	Raid Partition	
Apple_Bootstrap	NewWorld bootblock		Although it is a general Open Firmware (New World) boot partition, it is specifically used by yaboot and GRUB for loading PowerPC Linux, and will not automount under Mac OS X. It must be HFS formatted, so that it can be accessed by Open Firmware.
Apple_Driver	device driver	Macintosh	Classic Mac OS drivers partition
Apple_Driver43	SCSI Manager 4.3 device driver	Macintosh	Classic Mac OS drivers partition
Apple_Driver43_CD	SCSI CD-ROM device driver	Macintosh	Classic Mac OS drivers partition
Apple_Driver_ATA	ATA device driver	Macintosh	Classic Mac OS drivers partition
Apple_Driver_ATAPI	ATAPI device driver	Macintosh	Classic Mac OS drivers partition
Apple_Driver_IOKit	I/O Kit driver	Macintosh	Classic Mac OS drivers partition
Apple_Driver_OpenFirmware		Macintosh	
Apple_Extra	unused		This identifier masks an unused partition map entry.
Apple_Free	free space	Extra	This identifier masks free space as a partition map entry.
Apple_FWDriver	FireWire device driver	Macintosh	Classic Mac OS drivers partition
Apple_HFS	Hierarchical File System	Apple_HFS	While normally a HFS or HFS+ volume for Mac OS and Mac OS X, it can also contain an MS-DOS formatted file system (File Allocation Table, which can be accessed by Mac OS and Mac OS X).
Apple_HFSX	HFS Plus		This partition contains a HFS+ volume without a HFS wrapper. HFSX was introduced with Mac OS X 10.3 and is only used in special cases, like case sensitive HFS+. HFSX is the standard partition type on Intel-based Macs (which use GPT instead of APM).
Apple_Loader	–	SecondaryLoader	Like Apple_Boot but on Old World Macs, it is used when Mac OS X is installed on a file system not readable by Open Firmware. This partition does not contain a filesystem—instead it contains the BootX machine code in XCOFF format. This partition type was discontinued with Mac OS X 10.3.
Apple_MDFW	firmware	firmware	This partition is used by iPod to load the firmware/OS.
Apple_MFS	Macintosh File System		This partition is used by Mac OS for the Macintosh File System (MFS), which was introduced with the Macintosh 128K in 1984.
Apple_partition_map	partition map	Apple	The partition map is also a partition of its own. It can vary in size depending on how many partitions it may contain.
Apple_Patches	patches	Patch Partition	Mac OS classic patch partition
Apple_PRODOS	ProDOS		ProDOS file system
Apple_RAID	RAID	Apple_RAID_OfflineV2	This identifier marks a Mac OS X partition used in a software RAID configuration. It normally contains the same filesystems a regular Mac OS X installation would have, like HFS/HFS+ or UFS. The separate boot partition Apple_Boot is mandatory.
Apple_Rhapsody_UFS	Unix File System	Mac OS X Server	This partition contains a Unix File System (UFS) used by the Apple Rhapsody operating system (a development name marking the transition from OPENSTEP to Mac OS X) and is also used by Mac OS X Server 1.0 through 1.2 v3.
Apple_Scratch	empty		This identifier marks an empty partition.
Apple_Second			Second stage bootloader
Apple_UFS	Unix File System	Mac OS X	This partition contains a Unix File System (UFS) and is used by Mac OS X, Mac OS X Server (Version 10.0 and newer) and various Unix-like operating systems.
Apple_UNIX_SVR2	A/UX, Unix		Originally introduced for A/UX (Apple Unix operating system based on System V Release 2, hence SVR2) on the 68k, it was later reused for MkLinux which used the Extended file system. It is the standard partition identifier for many Unix-like operating systems, including Linux and NetBSD. It may contain any file system suitable for the installed operating system. If bootable, a file system that can be read by the Open Firmware bootloader from Apple_Bootstrap (e.g. yaboot) must be used.
Apple_Void	ISO9660 padding		A dummy partition map entry to ensure correct partition alignment on bootable media.
Be_BFS	Be File System		This partition contains a Be File System (BFS) and is normally used by BeOS.
MFS	TiVo Media File System	MFS application region, MFS media region	Used to hold the proprietary Media File System on TiVo hard drives formatted using Apple Partition Map.

=== Partition status ===
Partition status is a bit field composed of the flags:

Value	Description	System
0x00000001	entry is valid	A/UX
0x00000002	entry is allocated	A/UX
0x00000004	entry in use	A/UX
0x00000008	entry contains boot information	A/UX
0x00000010	partition is readable	A/UX
0x00000020	partition is writable	A/UX, Macintosh
0x00000040	boot code is position independent	A/UX
0x00000100	partition contains chain-compatible driver	Macintosh
0x00000200	partition contains a real driver	Macintosh
0x00000400	partition contains a chain driver	Macintosh
0x40000000	automatically mount at startup	Macintosh
0x80000000	the startup partition	Macintosh

== See also ==
- Amiga rigid disk block (RDB)
- BSD disklabel
- Extended boot record (EBR)
- GUID Partition Table (GPT)
- Host protected area (HPA)
- Master boot record (MBR)
