= Finder (software) =

Mac file manager and user interface shell

- Screenshot of a Finder window in macOS Big Sur displaying files in column view
- Stable release: 27.0 / September 14, 2026; 2 months ago
- Operating system: Classic Mac OS, macOS, GS/OS
- Type: File manager
- Website: support.apple.com/en-us/HT201732

The Finder is the default file manager and graphical user interface shell used on all Mac operating systems. Described in its "About" window as "The Macintosh Desktop Experience", it is responsible for the launching of other applications, and for the overall user management of files, disks, and network volumes. It was introduced with the Macintosh 128K—the first Mac computer—and also exists as part of GS/OS on the Apple IIGS. It was rewritten completely with the release of Mac OS X in 2001.

In a tradition dating back to the Classic Mac OS of the 1980s and 1990s, the Finder icon is the smiling screen of a computer, known as the Happy Mac logo.

== Description ==
=== Classic Mac OS ===
The classic Mac OS Finder used a spatial metaphor different from the browser-like approach of the current macOS Finder. In the classic Finder, opening a new folder opens it in a new window: Finder windows are "locked" so they would only ever display the contents of one folder. It also allowed for customization, with the user being able to give folders custom icons matching their content. This approach emphasizes the different locations of files within the operating system, but navigating to a folder nested inside multiple other folders fills the desktop with a large number of windows that the user may not wish to have open. These must then be closed individually. Holding down the option key when opening a folder would also close the one that opened it, but this trick was not discoverable and remained under the purview of power users.

=== macOS ===
In macOS, starting with Mac OS X 10.0, the Finder uses a view of the file system that is rendered using a desktop metaphor; the files and folders are represented as icons. It uses a similar interface to Apple's Safari browser, where the user can click on a folder to move to it and move between locations using "back" and "forward" arrow buttons. Like Safari, the Finder uses tabs to allow the user to view multiple folders; these tabs can be pulled off the window to make them separate windows. There is a "favorites" sidebar of commonly used and important folders on the left of the Finder window.

The modern Finder uses macOS graphics APIs to display previews of a range of files, such as images, applications and PDF files. The Quick Look feature allows users to quickly examine documents and images in more detail from the finder by pressing the space bar without opening them in a separate application. The user can choose how to view files, with options such as large icons showing previews of files, a list with details such as date of last creation or modification, a Gallery View (replacing the previous Cover flow in macOS Mojave), and a "column view" influenced by macOS's direct ancestor NeXTSTEP.

Finder shows certain aspects of the file system outside its windows. Mounted external volumes and disk image files can be displayed on the desktop. There is a trash can on the Dock, to which files can be dragged to mark them for deletion, and to which drives can be dragged for ejection. When a volume icon is being dragged, the Trash icon in the Dock changes to an eject icon to indicate this functionality. Finder can record files to optical media on the sidebar.

== Changes by versions ==
- In System 2.0, the New Folder and Shut Down commands were introduced, alongside a MiniFinder application for quickly launching any chosen application.
- In System 2.1, the Finder was changed to support the Hierarchical File System (HFS) as well as the Macintosh File System.
- In System 5, MultiFinder was introduced. It allows the user to have multiple apps opened simultaneously.
- MultiFinder support was expanded upon in System 6.
- In System 7, Finder's UI is revamped and is updated to allow for native multitasking, taking most of its features from MultiFinder.
- Mac OS 7.6 made drastic performance improvements by increasing memory allocation.
- Mac OS 8 redesigned the app to be based on the Platinum theme and rewrote it to be PowerPC-native, support 32-bit processors, and be multi-threaded. It also introduced pop-up windows, as well the Simple Finder, an option which reduces Finder menus to basic operations to avoid overwhelming new users.
- Mac OS 8.1 changed the Finder's default file system to be HFS Plus.
- Mac OS 9 introduced 128-bit file encryption to the app.
- Mac OS 9.1 introduced CD Burning and a new "Window" menu.
- Mac OS X 10.0 revamped the Finder from the ground up in the Carbon API; its UI is also redesigned to use Aqua with a web browser like layout, and removes CD burning, DVD burning, and colored labels.
- Mac OS X 10.1 reintroduced CD and DVD burning support from Mac OS 9.1, as well the ability to hide file extensions on a per-file basis. It also made significant performance improvements.
- Mac OS X Jaguar added a search bar to the app, powered by Sherlock 3.
- Mac OS X Panther revamped the app. It gained a brushed-metal interface, live search results, a customizable Sidebar, secure deletion, colored labels reintroduced from Mac OS 9, and ZIP support built in. The icon was also changed.
- In Mac OS X Tiger, the Window menu in the Finder introduced a "Cycle Through Windows" option, while the Get Info window for items in the Finder also added a "More Info" section that includes Spotlight information tags such as Image Height & Width, when the file was last opened, and where the file originated.
- In Mac OS X Leopard, the app is redesigned with skeuomorphic elements, alongside new features similar to those seen in iTunes 7, including Cover Flow and a Source List-like sidebar.
- In Mac OS X Snow Leopard, the app was rewritten from the ground up in Cocoa, and gained support for 64-bit processors. However, it did not receive a major user interface overhaul.
- In Mac OS X Lion, the app received numerous improvements, such as the ability for Finder search to allow multiple search criteria to be specified without creating a smart folder as well as to offer suggestions, the ability for files to be grouped by various attributes, and the ability to merge files under two folders with the same name, though a prompt appears asking to replace or keep both files. The navigation sidebar lost the ability to show the specific icon of a map or volume (by default; there is a hack to still add the old ability), instead it shows a grey standard map icon.
- In OS X Mountain Lion, the Finder displays a progress bar in the "size" column when copying a file.
- In OS X Mavericks, tabs, full-screen support, and document tags are introduced, while pinch-to-zoom and swipe-to-navigate-history gestures have been removed.
- In OS X Yosemite, the Finder is updated to include a refreshed user interface with updated typography and translucency, along with a new icon. Functionally, it also adds official support for extensions, allowing synchronization and cloud storage applications such as Dropbox to display sync status labels inside the Finder display.
- In OS X El Capitan, the Finder adds support for Spotlight queries using natural language.
- In macOS Sierra, the app gains an option to show folders always at the top of the view hierarchy, for instance in list views.
- In macOS High Sierra, the app adds support for features of the Apple File System (APFS), introducing fundamental changes to how the Finder handles file operations such as copying, duplicating, and calculating file sizes through copy-on-write technology, resulting in faster performance and improved reliability when managing files.
- In macOS Mojave, the app now has metadata preview accessed via View > Show Preview. In addition, the software updates are once again performed from the app, while a new Gallery View replaces Cover Flow, and lets users browse through files visually.
- In macOS Catalina, with the removal of iTunes, iOS device management is now done in the app.
- macOS Big Sur introduces a complete graphical redesign of the Finder, along with the rest of the user interface, sporting the removal of the brushed metal interface elements, a full-height sidebar and all new iconography. Big Sur also slightly modifies the Finder icon with rounded corners.
- In macOS Monterey, the toolbar was given a redesign and a few new features introduced.
- In macOS Ventura, alterations are made to prevent file spoofing.
- In macOS Sonoma, the feature allowing all apps to be hidden was changed, previously, it required holding down the option key when the icon was tapped, though now, in merely requires pressing the icon on the dock.
- MacOS Sequoia saw a few changes in iCloud management, Airdrop, and automation interaction.
- MacOS Tahoe only saw minor changes, like the possibility to change the font size independently from the system font size.
- MacOS Golden Gate integrated the Finder with Apple Intelligence, suggesting filenames when renaming files for example.

== Reception ==
Stewart Alsop II in 1988 said "It is testimony to either the luck or vision of the original designers" of Finder that "the interface has been able to survive tremendous evolution without much essential damage" from 1984. He praised its spatial file manager as "probably a more complete definition of a PC-based universe than any" competitor, with users able to seamlessly use floppies, local and remote hard disks, and large and small file servers. Alsop said that even if Apple had stolen Xerox's technology for Finder, it was now very different. While criticizing the lack of a right mouse button and MultiFinder's clumsiness, he concluded that "Apple remains the king of user interfaces. Finder is the only interface with 1.5 million people sitting in front of it daily. Apple is spending tremendous amounts of money on both development and basic research to remain the leader".

Introducing Mac OS X in 2000, Steve Jobs criticized the original Finder, saying that it "generates a ton of windows, and you get to be the janitor."

Ars Technica columnist John Siracusa has been a long-standing defender of the spatial interface of the classic Mac OS Finder and a critic of the new design. Daring Fireball blog author John Gruber has voiced similar criticisms. In a 2005 interview he said that the Finder in version 10.3 of Mac OS X had become "worse than in 10.0" and that "the fundamental problem with the OS X Finder is that it's trying to support two opposing paradigms at once – the browser metaphor ... and the spatial metaphor from the original Mac Finder ... and it ends up doing neither one very well." Reviewing the same version of Mac OS X, Siracusa comments that the Finder "provides exactly the same self-destructive combination of spatial and browser-style features as all of its Mac OS X predecessors".

== Finder replacements ==
Third-party macOS software developers offer Finder replacements that run as stand-alone applications, such as ForkLift, Path Finder, Xfile, Bloom, and XtraFinder. These replacements are shareware or freeware and aim to include and supersede the functionality of the Finder. After Mac OS X 10.4 Tiger the Unix command line file management tools understand resource forks and can be used for management of Mac files.

== Timeline ==
There are minor differences between Finder versions and Classic OS to System 7. From System 6 onward, the version numbers are unified.

Since the introduction of Mac OS X, the largest rewrite of the Finder was with the 2009 release of Mac OS X 10.6, into the Cocoa API, though little change was visible to the user.

Timeline of Mac operating systems

== See also ==
- Miller columns
- List of file managers
- Comparison of file managers
- File Explorer
