= MFS =

MFS may refer to:

== Education ==
- Maryknoll Fathers' School, a government-funded co-ed in Hong Kong SAR, P.R.C.
- Master of Forensic Sciences, a specialized professional degree
- Miletich Fighting Systems, a mixed martial arts training camp founded by Pat Miletich
- Moorestown Friends School, a private Quaker school located in Moorestown, New Jersey
- Moscow Finnish School, a Finnish private school in Russia

== Organizations ==
- Metropolitan Fire Service, South Australia's government-funded fire service
- Stasi, or Ministry for State Security (Ministerium für Staatssicherheit), the security and intelligence organisation of the German Democratic Republic
- Syriac Military Council (ܡܘܬܒܐ ܦܘܠܚܝܐ ܣܘܪܝܝܐ, Mawtbo Fulhoyo Suryoyo)

== Technology ==
- Metropolitan Fiber Systems, a telecommunications service provider acquired by WorldCom in 1997
- Mobile financial services, a term used in mobile banking
- Misfiring system or antilag system, a system used on turbocharged cars to cure turbo lag

=== Filesystems ===
- Macintosh File System, disk file system created by Apple Computer for storing files on 400K floppy disks
- MINIX file system, the native file system of the Minix operating system
- Media FileSystem, the filesystem used by TiVo
- Moose File System, an open-source distributed file system

== Science ==
- Material Flow System, a term used in material flow analysis, also can be a subsystem in various automated warehouse solutions (example: SAP EWM)
- Maximum flooding surface, the surface that marks the transition from a transgression to a regression
- Miller Fisher syndrome, a rare nerve disease, a variant of Guillain–Barré syndrome
- Marfan syndrome, a genetic disorder affecting connective tissue
- Major Facilitator Superfamily, a family of related proteins involved in active transport of solutes across a membrane
- Modern Fiction Studies, an academic journal

== Other ==
- MFS (label), a former German based trance label
- MFS 2000 Inc, a Hungarian ammunition manufacturer located in Sirok
- MFS Investment Management, formerly Massachusetts Financial Services
- Malta Film Studios
- Meeting for Sufferings, a consultative body in Britain Yearly Meeting of the Religious Society of Friends (Quakers)
- Microsoft Flight Simulator, an amateur flight simulator series
- Missouri Folklore Society, a historical society for Missouri folklore
- Multi-fuel stove, a type of stove
- Octaviar, Australian property group formerly known as MFS
