= MacOS Mojave =

2018 operating system version

macOS Mojave
- Version of the macOS operating system

- Screenshot of macOS Mojave desktop in dark mode, with Stocks and Voice Memos applications open
- Developer: Apple
- OS family: Macintosh; Unix
- Working state: No longer supported
- Source model: Closed, with open source components
- General availability: September 24, 2018; 8 years ago
- Latest release: 10.14.6 Security Update 2021-005 (18G9323) (July 21, 2021; 5 years ago) [±]
- Update method: Software Update
- Supported platforms: x86-64
- Kernel type: Hybrid (XNU)
- License: APSL and Apple EULA
- Preceded by: macOS High Sierra
- Succeeded by: macOS Catalina
- Official website: MacOS Mojave (archived at Wayback Machine)
- Tagline: Simply powerful.

Support status
- Obsolete, unsupported as of October 2021. iTunes is no longer being updated, but is able to download driver updates to sync to newer devices. (iTunes is replaced by separate apps in macOS Catalina, including Music, TV, Podcasts, and Finder for syncing devices.)

macOS Mojave (/moʊˈhɑːvi, mə-/ mo-HAH-vee; version 10.14) is the fifteenth major release of macOS, Apple's desktop operating system for Macintosh computers. macOS Mojave was announced at Apple's Worldwide Developers Conference on June 4, 2018, and was released to the public on September 24. The operating system's name refers to the Mojave Desert, continuing the use of California-themed names that began with OS X Mavericks. It succeeded macOS High Sierra and was followed by macOS Catalina. macOS Mojave is the last version of macOS that features the iTunes and Dashboard apps.

macOS Mojave brings several iOS apps to the desktop operating system, including Apple News, Voice Memos, and Home, as well as a more comprehensive "dark mode". Additionally, it is the final version of macOS to support 32-bit applications, is the last version of macOS capable of being booted from an HFS+ partition without third-party patching, and is also the last version of macOS to support the iPhoto app, which had already been superseded in OS X Yosemite (10.10) by the newer Photos app.

macOS Mojave was well received and was supplemented by point releases after launch.

== Overview ==
macOS Mojave was announced on June 4, 2018, at Apple's annual Worldwide Developers Conference in San Jose, California. The name came from the desert of the same name, part of a trend of California-themed releases dating to OS X Mavericks. Apple pitched Mojave as adding "pro" features that would benefit all users. The developer preview of the operating system was released for developers the same day, followed by a public beta on June 26. The retail version of 10.14 was released on September 24, 2018.

== System requirements ==
macOS Mojave requires a GPU that supports Metal, and the list of officially-compatible systems is more restrictive than the previous version, macOS High Sierra. Mojave drops support for various Macs released from late 2009 to 2011. Compatible models are the following Macintosh computers running OS X Mountain Lion or later:

- iMac (Late 2012 or later)
- iMac Pro (2017)
- MacBook (Early 2015 or later)
- MacBook Air (Mid 2012 or later)
- MacBook Pro (Mid 2012 or later)
- Mac Mini (Late 2012 or later)
- Mac Pro (2013, 2010–2012 supported with a Metal-capable graphics card)

macOS Mojave requires at least 2 GB of RAM as well as 12.5 GB of available disk space to upgrade from OS X El Capitan, macOS Sierra, or macOS High Sierra, or 18.5 GB of disk space to upgrade from OS X Yosemite and earlier releases. Some features are not available on all compatible models. Mojave installations convert the installation volume to Apple File System (APFS), if the volume had not previously been converted from HFS+.

== Changes ==
=== Default wallpaper ===
The default desktop picture is an image of the Mojave Desert.

=== System updates ===
macOS Mojave deprecates support for several legacy features of the OS. The graphics frameworks OpenGL and OpenCL are still supported by the operating system, but will no longer be maintained; developers are encouraged to use Apple's Metal library instead.

OpenGL is a cross-platform graphics framework designed to support a wide range of processors. Apple chose OpenGL in the late 1990s to build support for software graphics rendering into the Mac, after abandoning QuickDraw 3D. At the time, moving to OpenGL allowed Apple to take advantage of existing libraries that enabled hardware acceleration on a variety of different GPUs. As time went on, Apple has shifted its efforts towards building its hardware platforms for mobile and desktop use. Metal makes use of the homogenized hardware by abandoning the abstraction layer and running on the "bare metal". Metal reduces CPU load, shifting more tasks to the GPU. It reduces driver overhead and improves multithreading, allowing every CPU thread to send commands to the GPU.

macOS does not natively support Vulkan, the Khronos group's official successor to OpenGL. The MoltenVK library can be used as a bridge, translating most of the Vulkan 1.0 API into the Metal API.

Continuing the process started in macOS High Sierra (10.13), which issued warnings about compatibility with 32-bit applications, Mojave issues warnings when opening 32-bit apps that they will not be supported in future updates. In macOS Mojave 10.14, this alert appears once every 30 days when launching the app, as macOS 10.15 does not support 32-bit applications.

When Mojave is installed, it will convert solid-state drives (SSDs), hard disk drives (HDDs), and Fusion Drives, from HFS Plus to APFS. On Fusion Drives using APFS, files will be moved to the SSD based on the file's frequency of use and its SSD performance profile. APFS will also store all metadata for a Fusion Drive's file system on the SSD.

New data protections require applications to get permission from the user before using the Mac camera and microphone or accessing system data like user Mail history and Messages database.

=== Removed features ===
Mojave removes integrations with Facebook, Twitter, LinkedIn, Vimeo, and Flickr, which were added in OS X Mountain Lion and Mavericks.

Mojave also removes support for sub-pixel rendering of text. The feature was previously used on non-Retina displays to improve the appearance of text on screen.

The only supported Nvidia graphics cards are the Quadro K5000 and GeForce GTX 680 Mac Edition.

=== Applications ===
Mojave features changes to existing applications as well as new ones. Finder now has metadata preview accessed via View > Show Preview, and many other updates, including a Gallery View (replacing Cover Flow) that lets users browse through files visually. After a screenshot is taken, the image appears in the corner of the display, as with iOS. The screenshot software can now record video, choose where to save files, and be opened via ⇧ Shift + ⌘ Command + 5.

Safari's Tracking Prevention features now prevent social media "Like" or "Share" buttons and comment widgets from tracking users without permission. The browser also sends less information to web servers about the user's system, reducing the chance of being tracked based on system configuration. It can also automatically create, autofill, and store strong passwords when users create new online accounts; it also flags reused passwords so users can change them.

A new Screenshot app was added to macOS Mojave to replace the Grab app. Screenshot can capture a selected area, window or the entire screen as well as screen record a selected area or the entire display. The Screenshot app is located in the /Applications/Utilities/ folder, as was the Grab app. Screenshot can also be accessed by pressing ⇧ Shift+⌘ Command+3.

macOS 10.14.1, released on October 30, 2018, adds Group FaceTime, which lets users chat with up to 32 people at the same time, using video or audio from an iPhone, iPad or Mac, or audio from Apple Watch. Participants can join in mid-conversation.

The Mac App Store was rewritten from the ground up and features a new interface and editorial content, similar to the iOS App Store. A new 'Discover' tab highlights new and updated apps; Create, Work, Play and Develop tabs help users find apps for a specific project or purpose.

Four new apps (News, Stocks, Voice Memos and Home) are ported to macOS Mojave from iOS, with Apple implementing a subset of UIKit on the desktop OS. Third-party developers would be able to port iOS applications to macOS in 2019.

With Home, Mac users can control their HomeKit-enabled accessories to do things like turn lights off and on or adjust thermostat settings. Voice Memos lets users record audio (e.g., personal notes, lectures, meetings, interviews, or song ideas), and access them from iPhone, iPad or Mac. Stocks delivers curated market news alongside a personalized watchlist, with quotes and charts.

A few security fixes are made.

=== User interface ===
Mojave revamps Dark Mode. A light-on-dark color scheme, it initially affected only the dock, menu bar, and drop-down menus, while here, it darkens the entire user interface to make content stand out while the interface recedes. Users can choose dark or light mode when installing Mojave, or any time thereafter from System Preferences. All of the built-in apps support the revamp. App developers can implement the feature in their apps via a public API.

Stacks, a feature introduced in Mac OS X Leopard, now lets users group desktop files into groups based on file attributes such as file kind, date last opened, date modified, date created, name and tags. This is accessed via View > Use Stacks.

macOS Mojave features a new Dynamic Desktop that automatically changes specially made desktop backgrounds (two of which are included) to match the time of day.

The Dock has a space for recently used apps that have not previously been added to the Dock.

macOS update functionality has been moved back to System Preferences from the Mac App Store. In OS X Mountain Lion (10.8), system and app updates moved to the App Store from Software Update.

== Reception ==
Mojave was generally well received by technology press. The Verge's Jacob Kastrenakes considered Mojave a relatively minor update and typical of 2010s macOS releases, but Kastrenakes and Jason Snell thought the release hinted at the future direction of macOS. In contrast, Ars Technica's Andrew Cunningham felt that "Mojave feels, if not totally transformative, at least more consequential than the last few macOS releases have felt." Cunningham highlighted productivity improvements and continued work on macOS's foundation. TechCrunch's Brian Heater dubbed Mojave "arguably the most focused macOS release in recent memory", playing an important role in reassuring professional users that it was still committed to them.

Mojave's new features were generally praised. Critics welcomed the addition of Dark Mode, although some noted that its effect was inconsistent; MacWorld's Karen Haslam noted that it did not affect the bright white background in Pages, for instance. Others noted that Dark Mode's utility was curtailed by the lack of third-party developer support at release.

== Release history ==
Version	Date	Release notes	Download
10.14	September 24, 2018	Original Mac App Store release About the security content of macOS Mojave 10.14	—N/a
10.14.1	October 30, 2018	About the macOS Mojave 10.14.1 Update; About the security content of macOS Mojave 10.14.1	macOS Mojave 10.14.1 Update
10.14.2	December 5, 2018	About the macOS Mojave 10.14.2 Update; About the security content of macOS Mojave 10.14.2	macOS Mojave 10.14.2 Update macOS Mojave 10.14.2 Combo Update
10.14.3	January 22, 2019	About the macOS Mojave 10.14.3 Update; About the security content of macOS Mojave 10.14.3	macOS Mojave 10.14.3 Update macOS Mojave 10.14.3 Combo Update
10.14.3	February 7, 2019	About the security content of macOS Mojave 10.14.3 Supplemental Update	macOS Mojave 10.14.3 Supplemental Update
10.14.4	March 25, 2019	About the macOS Mojave 10.14.4 Update; About the security content of macOS Mojave 10.14.4	macOS Mojave 10.14.4 Update macOS Mojave 10.14.4 Combo Update
10.14.5	May 13, 2019	About the macOS Mojave 10.14.5 Update; About the security content of macOS Mojave 10.14.5	macOS Mojave 10.14.5 Update macOS Mojave 10.14.5 Combo Update
10.14.6	July 22, 2019	About the macOS Mojave 10.14.6 Update; About the security content of macOS Mojave 10.14.6	macOS Mojave 10.14.6 Update macOS Mojave 10.14.6 Combo Update
10.14.6	August 1, 2019	Addressed the Wake from Sleep bug, which caused Macs not waking from sleep properly.	~~macOS Mojave 10.14.6 Supplemental Update~~
10.14.6	August 26, 2019	Security updates and bug fixes: Addressed: MacBooks shutting down during sleep; Addressed: Performance throttling when handling large files; Addressed: iLife applications (Pages, Keynote, Numbers, GarageBand, and iMovie) not updating; Re-patched a vulnerability that was accidentally unpatched in the previous update, which could lead to hacking attempts	~~macOS Mojave 10.14.6 Supplemental Update~~
10.14.6	September 26, 2019	Security updates and bug fixes	macOS Mojave 10.14.6 Supplemental Update
10.14.6	October 29, 2019	About the security content of Security Update 2019-001	Security Update 2019-001 (Mojave)
10.14.6	December 10, 2019	About the security content of Security Update 2019-002	Security Update 2019-002 (Mojave)
10.14.6	January 28, 2020	About the security content of Security Update 2020-001	Security Update 2020-001 (Mojave)
10.14.6	March 24, 2020	About the security content of Security Update 2020-002	Security Update 2020-002 (Mojave)
10.14.6	May 26, 2020	About the security content of Security Update 2020-003	Security Update 2020-003 (Mojave)
10.14.6	July 15, 2020	About the security content of Security Update 2020-004	Security Update 2020-004 (Mojave)
10.14.6	September 24, 2020	About the security content of Security Update 2020-005	Security Update 2020-005 (Mojave)
10.14.6	October 1, 2020	About the security content of macOS 10.14.6 Supplemental Update	Security Update 2020-005 (Mojave)
10.14.6	November 12, 2020	About the security content of Security Update 2020-006	Security Update 2020-006 (Mojave)
10.14.6	December 14, 2020	About the security content of Security Update 2020-007	Security Update 2020-007 (Mojave)
10.14.6	February 1, 2021	About the security content of Security Update 2021-001	Security Update 2021-001 (Mojave)
10.14.6	February 9, 2021	About the security content of Security Update 2021-002	Security Update 2021-002 (Mojave)
10.14.6	April 26, 2021	About the security content of Security Update 2021-003	Security Update 2021-003 (Mojave)
10.14.6	May 24, 2021	About the security content of Security Update 2021-004	Security Update 2021-004 (Mojave)
10.14.6	July 21, 2021	About the security content of Security Update 2021-005	Security Update 2021-005 (Mojave)

== Timeline of Mac operating systems ==
Timeline of Mac operating systems

Preceded by macOS 10.13 (High Sierra)	macOS 10.14 (Mojave); 2018	Succeeded by macOS 10.15 (Catalina)
