= Case sensitivity =

Defines whether uppercase and lowercase letters are treated as distinct

The uppercase A and lowercase a are the two case variants of the first letter in the English alphabet.

In computers, case sensitivity defines whether uppercase and lowercase letters are treated as distinct (case-sensitive) or equivalent (case-insensitive). For instance, when users interested in learning about dogs search an e-book, "dog" and "Dog" are of the same significance to them. Thus, they request a case-insensitive search. But when they search an online encyclopedia for information about the United Nations, for example, or something with no ambiguity regarding capitalization and ambiguity between two or more terms cut down by capitalization, they may prefer a case-sensitive search.

== Areas of significance ==
Case sensitivity may differ depending on the situation:

- Searching: Users expect information retrieval systems to be able to have correct case sensitivity depending on the nature of an operation. Users looking for the word "dog" in an online journal probably do not wish to differentiate between "dog" or "Dog", as this is a writing distinction; the word should be matched whether it appears at the beginning of a sentence or not. On the other hand, users looking for information about a brand name, trademark, human name, or city name may be interested in performing a case-sensitive operation to filter out irrelevant results. For example, somebody searching for the name "Jade" would not want to find references to the mineral called "jade". On the English Wikipedia, for example, a search for friendly fire returns the military article, but Friendly Fire (capitalized "Fire") returns the disambiguation page. (Note: The link "Friendly Fire" must go through the (disambiguation) qualifier in a Wikipedia article to avoid a WP:INTDAB error.)
- Usernames: Authentication systems usually treat usernames as case-insensitive to make them easier to remember, reducing typing complexity, and eliminate the possibility of both mistakes and fraud when two usernames are identical in every aspect except the case of one of their letters. However, these systems are not case-blind. They preserve the case of the characters in the name so that users may choose an aesthetically pleasing username combination.
- Passwords: Authentication systems usually treat passwords as case-sensitive. This enables the users to increase the complexity of their passwords.
- File names: Traditionally, Unix-like operating systems treat file names case-sensitively while Microsoft Windows is case-insensitive but, for most file systems, case-preserving. For more details, see below.
- Variable names: Some programming languages are case-sensitive for their variable names while others are not. For more details, see below.
- URLs: The path, query, fragment, and authority sections of a URL may or may not be case-sensitive, depending on the receiving web server. The scheme and host parts, however, are strictly lowercase.

== In programming languages ==
Some programming languages are case-sensitive for their identifiers (C, C++, Java, C#, Verilog, Ruby, Python and Swift). Others are case-insensitive (i.e., not case-sensitive), such as ABAP, Ada, most BASICs (an exception being BBC BASIC), Common Lisp, Fortran, SQL (for the syntax, and for some vendor implementations, e.g. Microsoft SQL Server, the data itself) (Note: Although one can explicitly set a single database or column collation to be case-sensitive) Pascal, Rexx and ooRexx. There are also languages, such as Haskell, Prolog, and Go, in which the capitalisation of an identifier encodes information about its semantics. Some other programming languages have varying case sensitivity; in PHP, for example, variable names are case-sensitive but function names are not case-sensitive. This means that if a function is defined in lowercase, it can be called in uppercase, but if a variable is defined in lowercase, it cannot be referred to in uppercase. Nim is case-insensitive and ignores underscores, as long as the first characters match.

== In text search ==
A text search operation could be case-sensitive or case-insensitive, depending on the system, application, or context. The user can in many cases specify whether a search is sensitive to case, e.g. in most text editors, word processors, and Web browsers. A case-insensitive search is more comprehensive, finding "Language" (at the beginning of a sentence), "language", and "LANGUAGE" (in a title in capitals); a case-sensitive search will find the computer language "BASIC" but exclude most of the many unwanted instances of the word. For example, the Google Search engine is basically case-insensitive, with no option for case-sensitive search. In Oracle SQL, most operations and searches are case-sensitive by default, while in most other DBMSes, SQL searches are case-insensitive by default.

Case-insensitive operations are sometimes said to fold case, from the idea of folding the character code table so that upper- and lowercase letters coincide.

== In filesystems ==
In filesystems in Unix-like systems, filenames are usually case-sensitive (there can be separate readme.txt and Readme.txt files in the same directory). MacOS is somewhat unusual in that, by default, it uses HFS+ and APFS in a case-insensitive (so that there cannot be a readme.txt and a Readme.txt in the same directory) but case-preserving mode (so that a file created as readme.txt is shown as readme.txt and a file created as Readme.txt is shown as Readme.txt) by default. This causes some issues for developers and power users, because most file systems in other Unix-like environments are case-sensitive, and, for example, a source code tree for software for Unix-like systems might have both a file named Makefile and a file named makefile in the same directory. In addition, some Mac Installers assume case insensitivity and fail on case-sensitive file systems.

The older MS-DOS filesystems FAT12 and FAT16 were case-insensitive and not case-preserving, so that a file whose name is entered as readme.txt or ReadMe.txt is saved as README.TXT. Later, with VFAT in Windows 95 the FAT file systems became case-preserving as an extension of supporting long filenames. Later Windows file systems such as NTFS are internally case-sensitive, and a readme.txt and a Readme.txt can coexist in the same directory. However, for practical purposes filenames behave as case-insensitive as far as users and most software are concerned. This can cause problems for developers or software coming from Unix-like environments, similar to the problems with macOS case-insensitive file systems.
