= Block availability map =

File system data structure

In computer file systems, a block availability map (BAM) is a data structure used to track disk blocks that are considered free (available for new data). It is used along with a directory to manage files on a disk (originally only a floppy disk, and later also a hard disk).

In terms of Commodore DOS (CBM DOS) compatible disk drives, the BAM was a data structure stored in a reserved area of the disk (its size and location varied based on the physical characteristics of the disk). For each track, the BAM consisted of a bitmap of available blocks and (usually) a count of the available blocks. The count was held in a single byte, as all formats had 256 or fewer blocks per track. The count byte was simply the sum of all 1-bits in the bitmap of bytes for the current track.

The following table illustrates the layout of Commodore 1541 BAM. The table would be larger for higher-capacity disks (described below).

	Total byte	Bitmap byte 1	Bitmap byte 2	Bitmap byte 3
Track 1	blocks available	Blocks 0–7	Blocks 8–15	Blocks 16–23
Track 2	blocks available	Blocks 0–7	Blocks 8–15	Blocks 16–23
...	...	...	...	...
Track 35	blocks available	Blocks 0–7	Blocks 8–15	Blocks 16–23

The bitmap was contained in 3 bytes for Commodore 1541 format (single-sided) disks because it had 17 to 20 sectors per track (note 3 bytes can hold at least 20 bits). Similarly, the Commodore 1571 used 3 bytes for the bitmap of each track, but the BAM was twice the size because there were twice as many tracks when formatted as double-sided. In contrast, the Commodore 1581 disk drive used 5 bytes for the bitmap because the disk format had 40 blocks per track (note 5 bytes can hold 40 bits).

In the bitmap of any format, a 1 bit indicated the block was available (free), while a 0 bit indicated the block was not available (used), and the bitmap data was stored low-byte first. So the first byte held a map for blocks 0 to 7, the second byte held a map for blocks 8 to 15, and so on. Within a byte, the bitmap was ordered low-bit first. For example, the first byte would represent block 0 with the least significant bit and block 7 with the most significant bit.

Storage devices by Creative Micro Designs, intended for use with CBM computers, also used a Block Availability Map which served the same purpose. However, these devices (FD-2000, FD-4000, and CMD-HD) did not include a count byte, and the bits in each byte were reversed (high-bit first). Although the bits were reversed (compared to CBM formats), the bytes were still stored in the same order (low-byte first).

	Bitmap byte 1	Bitmap byte 2	...	Bitmap byte 32
Track 1	Blocks 0–7	Blocks 8–15	...	Blocks 248–255
Track 2	Blocks 0–7	Blocks 8–15	...	Blocks 248–255
...	...	...	...	...

== See also ==
- File Allocation Table (FAT)
- Design of the FAT file system
- Free space bitmap
