= Friendly Fire =

Friendly Fire(s) may refer to:

- Friendly fire, an attack on friendly troops while attempting to attack enemy/hostile targets

== Film and television ==
- Friendly Fire (1979 film), an American TV movie adaptation of a book by C. D. B. Bryan
- Friendly Fire (2006 film), a film by Sean Lennon and Michele Civetta
- Friendly Fire (2024 film), a Philippine sports drama
- Friendly Fire (TV series), a 2012–2013 Hong Kong legal drama

=== Television episodes ===
- "Friendly Fire" (Burn Notice), 2010
- "Friendly Fire" (Chicago Justice), 2017
- "Friendly Fire" (Meta Runner), 2020
- "Friendly Fire" (NCIS), 2018
- "Friendly Fire" (Press Gang), 1993
- "Friendly Fire" (Station 19), 2019

== Literature ==
- "Friendly Fire" (poem), a 2004 poem by James Michie
- Friendly Fire (poetry collection), a 2005 book by Jennifer Maiden
- Friendly Fire, a 1976 non-fiction book by C. D. B. Bryan; basis for the 1979 film
- Friendly Fire, a 2005 novel by Patrick Gale
- Friendly Fire, a 2002 play by Peter Gill
- Friendly Fire, a fictional superhero on the DC Comics team Section 8

== Music ==
- Friendly Fire Recordings, an American record label
- Friendly Fires, an English rock band

=== Albums ===
- Friendly Fire (Joe Lovano and Greg Osby album), 1998
- Friendly Fire (Sean Lennon album) or the title song, 2006
- Friendly Fire (Shara Nelson album) or the title song, 1995
- Friendly Fire: Live at Smoke, by Eric Alexander and Vincent Herring, 2012
- Friendly Fire, by the Orwells, 2023
- Friendly Fires (album), by Friendly Fires, 2008

=== Songs ===
- "Friendly Fire" (song), by Linkin Park, 2024
- "Friendly Fire", by Pet Shop Boys from the B-side of "I Get Along", 2002
- "Friendly Fire", by Holly Humberstone from The Walls Are Way Too Thin, 2021
- "Friendly Fire", by Skepta, 2025

== Other uses ==
- Friendly Fire (event), a German charity gaming live stream event
- Friendly Fire (podcast), a 2018–2021 war movie review podcast produced by Maximum Fun
