= Macintosh File System =

Disk file system by Apple Computer

MFS
- Developer(s): Apple Computer, Inc.
- Full name: Macintosh File System
- Introduced: January 24, 1984; 42 years ago with System 1
- Succeeded by: HFS
- Partition IDs: Apple_MFS (Apple Partition Map)

Structures
- Directory contents: Table
- File allocation: Linked list
- Bad blocks: No

Limits
- Max volume size: 20 MiB
- Max file size: 20 MiB
- Max no. of files: 4094
- Max filename length: 255 characters
- Allowed filename characters: Any printable character except “:”

Features
- Dates recorded: Creation, modification
- Date range: January 1, 1904 – February 6, 2040
- Date resolution: 1s
- Forks: Only 2 (data and resource)
- Attributes: version, locked, type, creator, Finder window, location in Finder window, Finder flags
- File system permissions: No
- Transparent compression: No
- Transparent encryption: No

Other
- Supported operating systems: System 1 — Mac OS 7.6, Mac OS 7.6.1 (read-only)

Macintosh File System (MFS) is a volume format (or disk file system) created by Apple Computer for storing files on 400K floppy disks. MFS was introduced with the original Apple Macintosh computer in January 1984.

MFS is notable both for introducing resource forks to allow storage of structured data, and for storing metadata needed to support the graphical user interface of the classic Mac OS. MFS allows file names to be up to 255 characters in length, although Finder does not allow users to create names longer than 63 characters (31 characters in later versions). MFS is called a flat file system because it does not support a hierarchy of directories.

Folders exist as a concept on the original MFS-based Macintosh but work completely differently from the way they do on modern systems. They are visible in Finder windows, but not in the open and save dialog boxes. There is always one empty folder on the volume, and if it is altered in any way (such as by adding or renaming files), a new Empty Folder appears, thus providing a way to create new folders. MFS stores all of the file and directory listing information in a single file. The Finder creates the illusion of folders, by storing all files as pairs of directory handles and file handles. To display the contents of a particular folder, MFS scans the directory for all files in that handle. There is no need to find a separate file containing the directory listing.

The Macintosh File System does not support volumes over 20 MB in size, or about 1,400 files. While this is small by today's standards, at the time it seemed very expansive when compared to the Macintosh's 400 KB floppy drive.

Apple introduced Hierarchical File System as a replacement for MFS in September 1985. In Mac OS 7.6.1, Apple removed support for writing to MFS volumes “as such writes often resulted in errors or system hangs”, and in Mac OS 8.0 support for MFS volumes was removed altogether. Although macOS (formerly Mac OS X) has no built-in support for MFS, an example VFS plug-in from Apple called MFSLives provides read-only access to MFS volumes.

== See also ==
- Comparison of file systems

== General and cited references ==
- Apple Computer, Inc. (1985). Inside Macintosh Volume II. New York: Addison-Wesley. ISBN 0-201-17732-3.
