= AIM alliance =

Business alliance

- Logos of Apple, IBM, and Motorola around AIM's formation
- Type: Joint venture
- Industry: Information technology
- Founded: October 2, 1991
- Defunct: c. 2006
- Fate: Dissolved
- Owners: Apple; IBM; Motorola

The AIM alliance was a partnership formed in October 1991 by Apple, IBM, and Motorola. The companies sought to develop an alternative computing platform based on RISC processors, open hardware standards, and new operating-system and multimedia technologies. The partnership was intended to challenge the dominance of Wintel, the combination of Microsoft Windows and Intel processors in the personal computer market.

The alliance had two main initiatives. The first was the development of the PowerPC family of microprocessors, based on the IBM POWER architecture. The second was the development of open standards for PowerPC-based hardware, beginning with the PowerPC Reference Platform (PReP) and followed by the Common Hardware Reference Platform (CHRP). These specifications were intended to allow multiple manufacturers to build computers capable of running different operating systems.

Alongside the AIM alliance, Apple, Hewlett-Packard, and IBM formed Taligent, which was tasked with developing Apple's Pink prototype into a commercial object-oriented operating system. Apple and IBM also formed Kaleida Labs, which developed ScriptX, a cross-platform multimedia scripting language.

The software ventures did not achieve their original objectives. Kaleida Labs closed in 1995, and Taligent's technology and employees were transferred to IBM in 1998. The PReP and CHRP standards also saw limited adoption. Apple ended its Macintosh clone program in 1997, reducing the prospects for third-party manufacturers to produce computers compatible with its operating system. The PowerPC processors, however, became the basis of Apple's Macintosh computers from 1994 until the company's transition to Intel processors in 2006. PowerPC processors were also used in workstations, servers, embedded systems, supercomputers, and video game consoles.

== History ==
=== Development ===
From the 1980s into the 1990s, the computer industry was moving from a model of just individual personal computers toward an interconnected world, where no single company could afford to be vertically isolated anymore. One analyst explained, "If you try to do everything, you can't have economies of scale." Apple, IBM, and Motorola were important technology companies, but Intel processors powered 85 percent of personal computers, and Microsoft dominated the market for operating systems. Motorola wanted to erode Intel's lead in the processor market, and Apple and IBM foresaw relegation to packaging Microsoft and Intel technology. Infinite Loop says "most people at Apple knew the company would have to enter into ventures with some of its erstwhile enemies, license its technology, or get bought". Microsoft's monopoly and the Wintel duopoly threatened competition industrywide, and their competing Advanced Computing Environment (ACE) consortium was recently formed to promote x86 and MIPS architectures.

In the late 1980s, Apple used Motorola 68000 series CPUs for its computers. Intel's Andy Grove tried to persuade Apple to transition to x86, but CEO John Sculley and others believed that CISC microprocessors such as x86 would not be competitive with RISC. Phil Hester, a designer of the IBM RS/6000, convinced IBM's president Jack Kuehler of the necessity of a business alliance. Kuehler called Apple President Michael Spindler, who bought into the approach for a design that could challenge the Wintel PC model. Sculley was even more enthusiastic.

On July 3, 1991, Apple and IBM signed a non-contractual letter of intent, proposing an alliance and outlining its long-term strategic technology goals. Its main goal was creating a single unifying open-standard computing platform for the whole industry, made of a new hardware design and a next-generation operating system. IBM and Motorola planned to have 300 engineers to codevelop chips at a joint manufacturing facility in Austin, Texas. Motorola planned to sell the chips to Apple or anyone else. IBM intended to bring the Macintosh operating system into the enterprise and Apple intended to become a prime customer for the new POWER hardware platform.

Industry analysts considered AIM's announcement to be critically poorly communicated and confusing to the outside world, but nonetheless saw this partnership as an overall competitive force against Microsoft's monopoly and Intel's and Microsoft's duopoly. The urgency for the AIM alliance was heightened by Microsoft's recent formation of the competing Advanced Computing Environment (ACE), a 21-company consortium intended to establish a new industry standard based on x86 and MIPS architecture processors. Some analysts viewed AIM as a direct, and perhaps late, counter-alliance to the formidable ACE. Some viewed AIM as a bold but risky attempt to create a new "mainstream" of computing, with one expert noting the formidable challenge ahead: "Apple and IBM are going to have to be more than friends. They are going to have to be brothers."

Executives said the negotiations were stop and go, sometimes seeming to founder and then speeding up as impasses were resolved. The main disagreements occurred when one company or the other thought it was giving away too much technology. Executives said that the technological contributions of both sides were evaluated and that money was used to balance the terms, in what negotiators referred to as the "cosmic arithmetic". But how much money is being paid, and which company is paying, is closely guarded information.

— The New York Times

Between the three companies, more than 400 people had been involved to define a more unified corporate culture with less top-down executive decree. They collaborated as peers and future coworkers in creating the alliance and the basis of its ongoing future dialog which promised to "change the landscape of computing in the 90s".

=== Launch ===
In 1992, the earth shook: IBM and Apple clasped hands and pronounced themselves allies. From this union sprang Taligent ... developing nothing less than a universal operating system.

— Macworld

On October 2, 1991, the historic AIM alliance was officially formed with a contract between Apple CEO John Sculley, IBM Research and Development Chief Jack Kuehler, and IBM Vice President James Cannavino. Kuehler said "Together we announce the second decade of personal computing, and it begins today" and Sculley said this would "launch a renaissance in technological innovation", as they signed the foot-high stack of papers comprising the contract. The New York Times called it "an act that a year ago almost no one in the computer world would have imagined possible". It was so sweeping that it underwent antitrust review by the US government.

In 1992, Apple and IBM created two new companies called Taligent and Kaleida Labs as had been declared in the alliance contract, with the expectation that neither would launch any products until the mid-'90s. Since 1988, Apple had already developed its next-generation operating system prototype, codenamed Pink; and Taligent was launched to bring Pink to market as the ultimate crossplatform object-oriented operating system plus application frameworks. Kaleida was to create an object-oriented, cross-platform multimedia scripting language to further enable creation of entirely new kinds of multimedia applications to harness the power of the platform. IBM provided affinity between its own Workplace OS and Taligent, replacing Taligent's microkernel with the IBM Microkernel and adopting Taligent's CommonPoint application framework into Workplace OS, OS/2, and AIX.

It's natural that many people saw Apple's alliance with former adversary IBM Corp. as an ominous portent for the independent future of the Macintosh. The sight of Apple and IBM chief executives gripping and grinning on national television wasn't nearly as confusing as their vow to bring the Mac and IBM desktop computers into the 21st century with shared technology such as PowerPC chips, PowerOpen Unix, and new operating software from Taligent Inc. and Kaleida Labs Inc. Present and future shock aside, that's a lot to digest.

— MacWeek

The alliance's hardware is based on the PowerPC processors—the first of which, the PowerPC 601, is a single-chip version of IBM's POWER1 CPU. Both IBM and Motorola would manufacture PowerPC integrated circuits for this new platform. The computer architecture base is called PReP (PowerPC Reference Platform), later complemented with OpenFirmware and renamed CHRP (Common Hardware Reference Platform). IBM used PReP and CHRP for the PCI version of IBM's RS/6000 platform, which was adapted from existing Micro Channel architecture models, and changed only to support the new 60x bus style of the PowerPC.

The development of the PowerPC is centered at an Austin, Texas, facility called the Somerset Design Center. The building is named after the site in Arthurian legend where warring forces put aside their swords, and members of the three teams that staff the building say the spirit that inspired the name has been a key factor in the project's success thus far.

— MacWeek, 1993

Part of the culture here is not to have an IBM or Motorola or Apple culture, but to have our own.

— Motorola's Russell Stanphill, codirector of Somerset

In 1994, with the Mac transition to PowerPC processors, Apple delivered Power Macintosh, its first alliance-based hardware platform, on schedule as predicted by the original alliance contract. Infinite Loop considered the PowerPC to be five years too late to the overall market, "no more than a welcome offering to Apple's own market base", and further hamstrung by the legacy architecture of System 7.

=== Downturn ===
In 1995, IT journalist Don Tennant asked Bill Gates to reflect upon "what trend or development over the past 20 years had really caught him by surprise". Gates responded with what Tennant described as biting, deadpan sarcasm: "Kaleida and Taligent had less impact than we expected." Tennant believed the explanation to be that "Microsoft's worst nightmare is a conjoined Apple and IBM. No other single change in the dynamics of the IT industry could possibly do as much to emasculate Windows."

Apple had sought a larger partner since the late 1980s, and expected that the AIM alliance would result in IBM becoming a large Macintosh clone maker. It hoped that IBM might even acquire Apple, with the latter taking over the former's IBM PC business. Growth in IBM mainframe sales—far more profitable than PCs—caused that company's interest in the latter and Apple to decrease. In 1996, Fortune wrote, "Apple now finds itself in a loveless marriage", dependent on a disinterested IBM that sometimes delivered new CPU designs late. Efforts by Motorola and IBM to popularize PReP and CHRP failed when Apple, IBM, and Taligent all failed to provide a single comprehensive reference operating system for server and personal markets—mainly Taligent's OS or IBM's Workplace OS. Windows NT was the only OS with mainstream consumer recognition that had been ported to PowerPC, but there was virtually no market demand for it on this non-mainstream hardware. Although PowerPC was eventually supported by several Unix variants, Windows NT, and Workplace OS (in the form of OS/2), these operating systems generally ran just as well on commodity Intel-based hardware so there was little reason to use the PReP systems. The BeBox, designed to run BeOS, uses some PReP hardware but is overall incompatible with the standard. Kaleida Labs closed in 1995. Taligent was absorbed into IBM in 1998. Some CHRP machines shipped in 1997 and 1998 without widespread reception.

Relations between Apple and Motorola further deteriorated in 1998 with the return of Steve Jobs to Apple and his contentious termination of Macintosh clone licensing. Reportedly, a heated telephone conversation between Jobs and Motorola CEO Christopher Galvin resulted in the long-favored Apple being demoted to "just another customer", mainly for PowerPC CPUs. In retaliation, Apple and IBM briefly expelled Motorola from the AIM alliance, and forced Motorola to stop making PowerPC CPUs, leaving IBM to design and produce all future PowerPC chips. Motorola was reinstated into the alliance in 1999.

== Legacy ==
The PowerPC is the clearest intended success that came out of the AIM alliance. From 1994 to 2006, Apple used PowerPC chips in almost every Macintosh. PowerPC also has had success in the embedded market, and in video game consoles: GameCube, Wii, Wii U, Xbox 360, and PlayStation 3.

After being reinstated into the AIM alliance, Motorola helped IBM to design some laptop PowerPC chips with IBM's manufacturing. In 2004, Motorola spun off its Semiconductor production as Freescale Semiconductor, and left the AIM alliance completely, leaving IBM and Apple in the alliance. Freescale continued to help IBM design PowerPC chips until Freescale was acquired and absorbed by NXP Semiconductors in 2015.

Sculley said in 2003 that not choosing Intel for Apple was "probably one of the biggest mistakes I've ever made". Apple transitioned entirely to Intel CPUs in 2006, due to eventual disappointment with the direction and performance of PowerPC development as of the G5 model, especially in the fast-growing laptop market. This was seen as the end of the AIM alliance as that left IBM as the sole user of PowerPC.

Taligent was launched from the original AIM alliance, based originally on Apple's Pink operating system. From Taligent came the CommonPoint application framework and many global contributions to internationalization and compilers, in the form of Java Development Kit 1.1, VisualAge C++, and the International Components for Unicode open source project.

Power.org was founded in 2004 by IBM and fifteen partners with intent to develop, enable, and promote Power Architecture technology, such as PowerPC, POWER, and software applications.

The OpenPOWER Foundation is a collaboration around Power ISA–based products initiated by IBM and announced as the "OpenPOWER Consortium" on August 6, 2013. It has more than 250 members. In 2019, IBM announced its open-sourcing of the Power ISA.

== See also ==
- Advanced RISC Computing
