= Don Hopkins =

American computer scientist

Don Hopkins is an artist and programmer specializing in human computer interaction and computer graphics. He is an alumnus of the University of Maryland and a former member of the University of Maryland Human–Computer Interaction Lab.

He inspired Richard Stallman, who described him as a "very imaginative fellow", to use the term copyleft. He coined Deep Crack as the name of the EFF DES cracker. He ported the SimCity computer game to several versions of Unix and developed a multi player version of SimCity for X11, did much of the core programming of The Sims, and developed robot control and personality simulation software for Will Wright's Stupid Fun Club.

He developed and refined pie menus for many platforms and applications including window managers, Emacs, SimCity and The Sims, and published a frequently cited paper about pie menus at CHI'88 with John Raymond Callahan, Ben Shneiderman and Mark Weiser. He has published many free software and open source implementations of pie menus for X10, X11, NeWS, Tcl/tk, ScriptX, ActiveX, JavaScript, OpenLaszlo, Python and OLPC, and also proprietary implementations for The Sims and the Palm Pilot.

Hopkins also wrote demonstrations and programming examples of the ScriptX multimedia scripting language created by the Apple/IBM research spinoff Kaleida Labs, developed various OpenLaszlo applications and components, and is a hacker artist known for his artistic cellular automata. He is also known for having written a chapter "The X-Windows Disaster" on X Window System in the book The UNIX-HATERS Handbook.

== Micropolis ==
Hopkins, supported by John Gilmore, adapted SimCity for the OLPC XO-1 laptop. The current version includes pie menus and is explained in depth in a video released by Hopkins.

Since its primary objective is education, the OLPC project is looking not just for games, but for tools that enable kids to program their own games. Hopkins programmed Micropolis to make it easy to extend in many interesting ways. He added functionality to let kids create new disasters and agents (like the monster, tornado, helicopter and train), and program them like in many of the other games on the XO. The goals of deeply integrating SimCity with OLPC's Sugar user interface are to focus on education and accessibility for younger kids, as well as motivating and enabling older kids to learn programming.

== The Sims ==
The Sims is a simulation video game developed by Electronic Arts. The games are known for their very loose guidelines and no specific user goals. They allow the users to simply exist in the virtual world they create. Don Hopkins became involved in The Sims after he worked at Sun Microsystems. The Sims were a theme in his work since then and he has contributed to much of the design and conceptual development of the game. He was hired to port The Sims to Unix. He implemented the usage of pie menus to the game so that users could efficiently carry out actions in the game world.
