= Corporate immune system =

Sociological term

The term corporate immune system, or corporate immune response, refers to a process within corporations that demands organizations within the company accomplish activities in a certain way, a form of conformity tendencies. It is, in effect, the active form of groupthink, when the past outcome of groupthink processes forces itself on organizations that are otherwise different.

The term is most commonly used to describe such processes that drive out innovation and entrepreneurial activity within organizations. This is often found in large multi-divisional companies, where it manifests itself as inter-divisional fighting, often subtle or unintended. Multinational corporations are particularly common examples, as divisional differences can be compounded by different corporate structures, languages and even time zones.

== Basic definition ==
The term may refer to any organizational process that tends to drive out differences, or alternately demands conformity. The name refers to parallels with biological immune systems, which attempt to drive out "foreign" invaders and sometimes react negatively against the organism it is supposed to protect:

Much as the human body sends out white blood cells to fight off anything that is aberrant to the greater host organism, corporations encourage -- often subtly -- the operations which have different work cultures to be more like everyone else. Importantly, this phenomenon often occurs even when the aberrant organization is superior to the norm. The immune system in the body is built into the cells in the bloodstream. It has the task of eliminating or neutralizing any alien bodies that find their way into the system. This system acts to prevent alien substances from affecting the body in a harmful way. However, as in the case of the rejection of an organ transplant, it is possible that the immune system may reject an alien body that is to its long-term benefit. By analogy, our belief is that most initiatives, and subsidiary initiatives in particular, face a corporate immune system that views them as alien and potentially harmful bodies.

The essence of the term is the activity of driving out differences, as opposed to the natural tendency to do so.

== Stifling innovation ==
=== Underlying issues ===
Within any corporation, managers are presented with new projects and have to gain funding and staffing resources to implement them. These projects may be organizational in nature, implementing a new sales and inventory system for instance, or product related, like manufacturing and marketing a new toy. The process of introducing and implementing new ideas is a well studied area of business theory.

At any point in time, any particular manager might be presented with several new ideas, and has to choose which among these to promote. Implementation carries with it certain risks, both outright failure of the initiative, or through opportunity costs when some other initiative is not carried out due to conflicting needs or lack of resources. In larger companies, many managers will present ideas that have to compete for larger pools of resources, as decided on by upper management. Corporations normally have well-defined procedures for assessing these proposals, in order to decide among the many concepts so the most rewarding and viable projects gain support.

In an ideal corporation, the company would attempt to assess the proposal and decide whether or not to fund it based solely on its merits. Under these circumstances, it would be expected that most errors in this process would be the rejection of good ideas, rather than the approval of bad ones. This is because large corporations are typically dedicated to certain markets, and dedicate a large amount of their resources to improving the processes that address those markets in order to improve efficiency as well as competitiveness. Ideas for new products or markets are generally more risky, or at least more difficult to assess, than ideas that apply to the existing corporation, which is better understood. That is, corporations tend to focus on "exploitation", to the detriment of "exploration".

=== Manifestation and examples ===
Real-world companies rarely act in a manner that one might consider "ideal". Among the many problems that might cause a good idea to be rejected are a lack of resources, a lack of market understanding, and any number of external or internal factors. Corporate immune response may be one of these internal factors, manifesting itself as internecine fighting between divisions, or simply the rejection of ideas from divisions that are "too different" to be understood. In this context, it could be any of "the set of organizational forces that suppress the advancement of creation-oriented activities such as initiatives."

Apple Computer has been a common example of the corporate immune response in action. During the late 1980s and the 1990s in particular, many ideas were promoted within the company, only to face severe attacks by other groups within the company. Many of these attacks were not based on real problems with the ideas, but more typically a perceived threat to the sales of an existing product. For instance, the Newton faced enormous problems within the company and almost caused its inventor to quit the company. Other frequently-cited examples in computing include Taligent, OpenDoc, Workplace OS, and the Star Trek project.

== See also ==
- Groupthink
- Not Invented Here
