= Open Media Network =

The Open Media Network (OMN) was a P2PTV service and application which provided distribution of educational and public service programs. The network was founded in 2005 by Netscape pioneers Mike Homer and Marc Andreessen. After operating for an extended beta period, development ended with the serious illness and subsequent death in 2009 of founder Homer.

The OMN network operated as a large, centrally controlled grid network for the distribution of free radio and TV content over P2P, described as "part TiVo, part BitTorrent file swapping". The Open Media Network client application was available for Apple Mac OS X (but not Intel based Macs as of October 2007) and Microsoft Windows (XP and 2000, but not Vista as of October 2007).

The OMN infrastructure was powered by Kontiki grid network technology, a commercial alternative to BitTorrent.

The U.S. Public Broadcasting Service (PBS) launched a "download to own" initiative with OMN and Google which allowed viewers to purchase episodes of popular PBS programs via the Internet for viewing anytime, anywhere. The fees for downloading videos ranged from about $2 to about $8 (U.S.). Video files were made available in whatever format the producer chose, including WMV, QuickTime and Google's GVI format.

== See also ==
- PPLive
- Cybersky-TV
- Octoshape
- Miro
