= Michael Homer =

American electronics and computer industry executive (1958-2009)

Michael J. Homer (February 24, 1958 – February 1, 2009) was an American electronics and computer industry executive who played major roles in the development of the personal computer, mobile devices and the Internet.

== Life and career ==
Homer was born in San Francisco on February 24, 1958 and was awarded a bachelor's degree at the University of California, Berkeley.

He was hired by Apple Computer in 1982, where he served as the technology adviser to the firm's chief executive, John Sculley. He followed with a position as marketing vice president at GO Corp., an early pioneer in creating software for mobile computers and personal digital assistants that did early work in pen-based computing.

After Go closed in 1994, John Doerr of Kleiner Perkins Caufield & Byers, Go's main venture capital backer, made the connection for Homer at Marc Andreessen's Netscape Communications Corporation. Homer was a vice president at the Netscape in the 1990s at the dawn of the World Wide Web. There, Homer developed the company's initial business plan and played a pivotal role in obtaining the private financing necessary to allow the company to progress to its 1995 initial public offering. He developed marketing plans for Netscape in 1994 at a time when few people had ever heard of the Internet. During the period where Microsoft challenged Netscape's early browser dominance with its Internet Explorer product, Homer headed the firm's marketing department as it faced bitter competition from Microsoft, a challenge that ultimately resulted in an antitrust suit. Homer helped argue that Microsoft had abused its monopoly power in the operating system market to push out Netscape's browser in favor of its own.

Following AOL's acquisition of Netscape in 2000, Homer founded Kontiki, a peer-assisted content delivery technology company, that was purchased by VeriSign in March 2006 for $62 million, with a proviso that the rights to use the firm's technology would be donated to the non-profit Open Media Network. Homer fostered the early growth of a series of technology firms, including roles in the development of Google, Tellme Networks and TiVo, and sat on the board of Palm, Inc.

=== Illness ===
In 2007, persistent memory problems he had been experiencing led to a diagnosis of Creutzfeldt–Jakob disease, a very rare and incurable degenerative neurological disorder. Several people close to him created "Fight for Mike", an organization that raised $7 million used to fund research in the neurology department of the University of California, San Francisco towards study and potential cure of the disease. The team at UCSF includes Dr. Stanley B. Prusiner, winner of the Nobel Prize in Physiology or Medicine in 1997 for his discovery of the prion, misfolded proteins that trigger CJD and bovine spongiform encephalopathy ("mad cow disease"). The team at UCSF was studying the use of Quinacrine, long used as an antimalarial drug, in the treatment of CJD.

Homer died at age 50 on February 1, 2009 in Atherton, California. He was survived by his wife, three children, his mother and sister. The science center at Sacred Heart Schools, Atherton is named after him.
