= John Wainwright (computer scientist) =

Australian computer scientist, creator of the SxriptX, MaxScript operating system

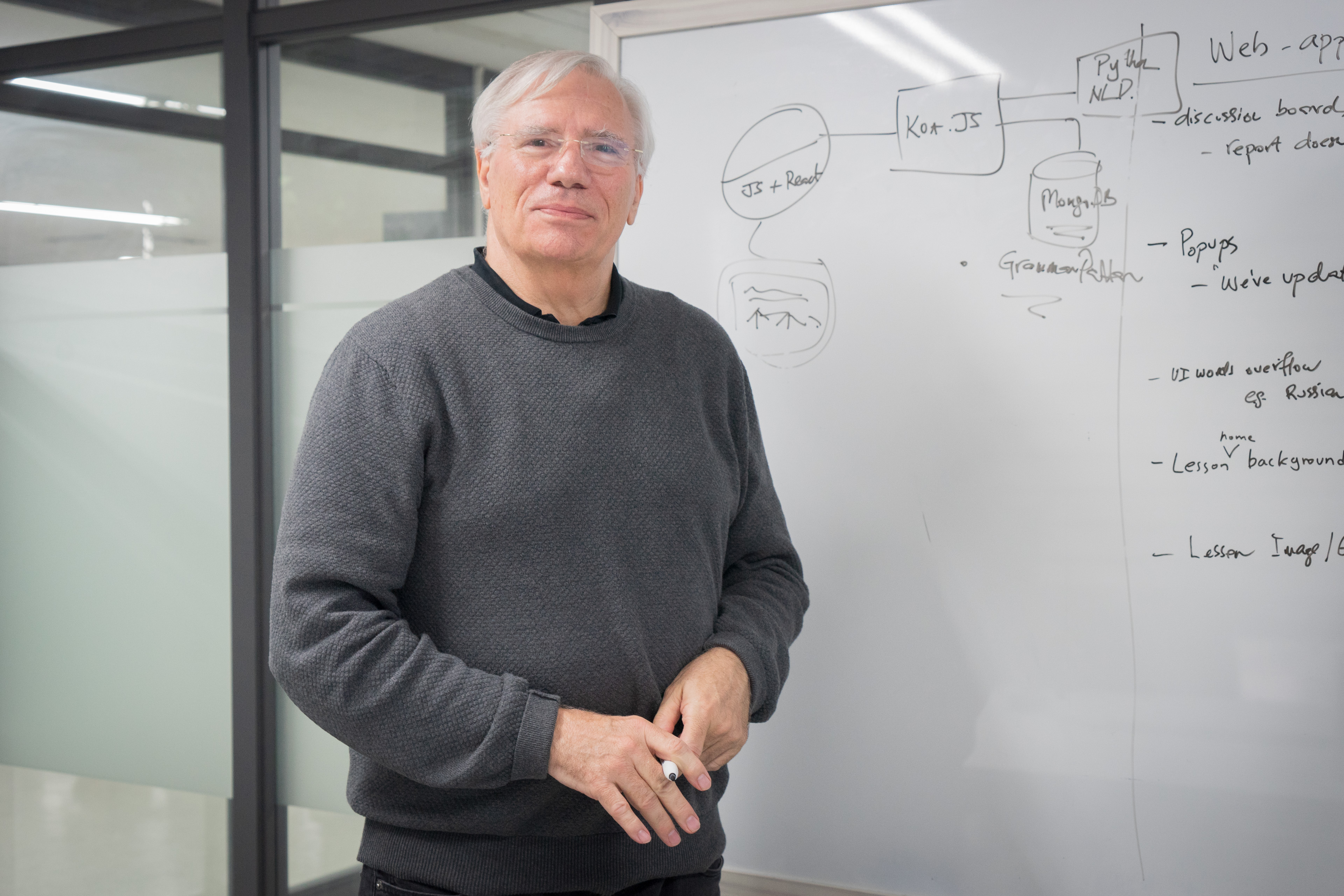
- Wainwright in 2022
- Citizenship: Australian
- Known for: ScriptX; MaxScript
- Scientific career
- Fields: Computer science

John Wainwright is an Australian computer scientist and developer of pure object-based computer languages. He is the principal architect of two computer languages, ScriptX (1992–1996) and MaxScript (1996).

In 1992, Wainwright sold Objects in C, a structural framework for an object based, language, and virtual machine operating system that he designed, to Apple computer. He became the lead architect for ScriptX, a language and media player developed by Kaleida Labs.

After Kaleida Labs closed in 1996, Wainwright went on to serve as the principal architect of MaxScript, the scripting language of Autodesk 3ds Max. This language has been used in game development as a part of the Maxis Sims animation processing pipeline. Compared to ScriptX, MaxScript has explicit syntax to support 3D animation.

Wainwright was the Chief Technology Officer at Crowd Science, an online advertising technology company he co-founded in 2007 with his nephew, John Martin, and Paul Neto. Crowd Science was funded by Granite Ventures.

As of 2015, Wainwright is the Vice President of Engineering at Kollective Technology Inc. (previously known as Kontiki Inc.), a company he co-founded in 2001.

Wainwright was also the first non-employee Amazon.com customer, ordering the book Fluid Concepts and Creative Analogies. An Amazon building is named after him.

In 2020, he co-founded Mirinae, Inc. in South Korea and developed a Korean language learning cloud service.
