= No Size Fits All =

2009 book by Tom Hayes and Michael S. Malone

No Size Fits All: From Mass Marketing to Mass Handselling
- Authors: Tom Hayes and Michael S. Malone
- Publisher: Portfolio
- Publication date: 2009
- Pages: 274
- ISBN: 1591842670
- OCLC: 318411523

No Size Fits All: From Mass Marketing to Mass Handselling (ISBN 1591842670) is a 2009 book by Tom Hayes and Michael S. Malone.
