= Michael S. Malone =

American novelist

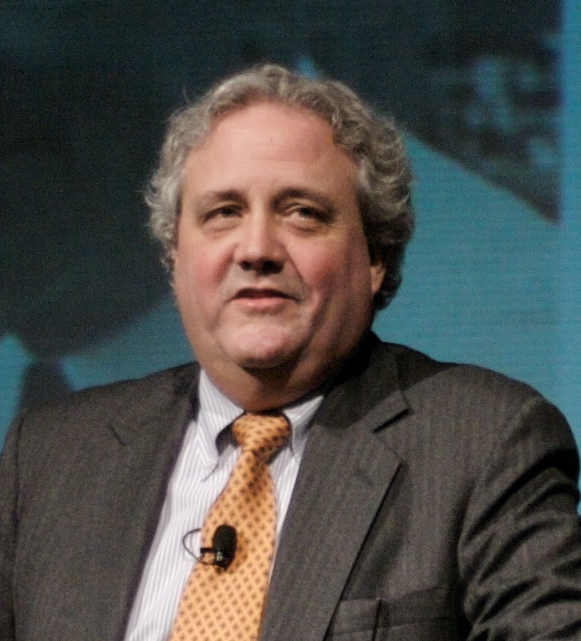
- Malone at Los Altos History Museum
- Born: Michael Shawn Malone; January 21, 1954 (age 72); Fürstenfeldbruck, West Germany
- Education: Santa Clara University (MBA)
- Occupations: Author; columnist; editor; investor; businessman; television producer; host
- Writing career
- Subjects: Business, media, computer technology, law, politics
- Website: www.michaelsmalone.com

Michael Shawn Malone (born January 21, 1954) is an American author, columnist, editor, investor, businessman, and television producer. He has been the host of several shows on PBS. As of 2009, Malone is a columnist for ABC News, an op-ed contributor for The Wall Street Journal, a contributing editor to Wired, and the editor-in-chief of Edgelings.com, a website focused on business and technology news in Silicon Valley.

Malone is the author of numerous books and has written the "Silicon Insider" column for ABC since 2000. In his professional writing he usually uses the name "Michael S. Malone", to distinguish his work from that of another U.S. author named Michael Malone, primarily a writer of fiction.

== Early life and education ==
Malone was born in 1954 in Fürstenfeldbruck in Bavaria, a state in West Germany. His father was a U.S. Air Force officer who was dyslexic and who later worked as a freelance writer. After living in Munich for a time, he grew up in Sunnyvale, California. He graduated from Santa Clara University in 1975 and received his MBA from SCU in 1977.

== Professional career ==
Malone worked in public relations for Hewlett-Packard Co. before joining the San Jose Mercury-News in 1979. During 1980, he joined the San Jose Mercury News and became one of the nation's first daily high-tech reporters.

For his work breaking stories on toxic waste, drugs, sweatshops, and espionage, he was nominated for a Pulitzer Prize twice, but he quickly left The Mercury News in 1981 and became a freelancer. Malone's work appeared in The Wall Street Journal, The Mercury News, the Los Angeles Times, Forbes ASAP, Upside Magazine, Fast Company, The New York Times, and others under various roles between 1981 and 2001.

He has also written for the Wall Street Journal and the New York Times, is a former editor of Forbes ASAP, and has contributed to Upside and Fast Company magazines. He was also the host of Malone, an interview series on KTEH, the PBS station in San Jose, California. In 2000 he became the "Silicon Insider" columnist of ABC News' website.

Malone is the author of 15 books, covering the world of business and technology, including Infinite Loop: How Apple, the World's Most Insanely Great Computer Company, Went Insane (ISBN 0-385-48684-7), The Big Score, The Virtual Corporation and Intellectual Capital, Going Public, Virtual Selling, and One Digital Day.

=== Notable works and honours ===
Of his work for ABC, Malone has written that "Over the near-decade I've had this job, I've probably written five columns that drew major national attention: calling for Dan Rather's firing, declaring the decline of Microsoft, predicting the death of newspapers, naming Matt Drudge the most influential journalist in America and" (alleging liberal) "media bias in the recent" (2008) presidential election.

In 2004, he was named a Distinguished Friend of Oxford University.

Malone produced the four-episode/four-hour PBS miniseries The New Heroes (2005), with colleague Bob Grove and executive producer David Davis. He also authored liner notes for the accompanying soundtrack CD.

Hosted by Robert Redford, "The New Heroes" was about social entrepreneurship. The series, which aired in primetime, was nominated for an Emmy (27th Annual News & Documentary Emmy Awards) in the category of "Outstanding Achievement in a Craft: Cinematography", but did not win.

== Private life ==
Malone is a fan of baroque pop–band The Zombies. He also has written about his support of contemporary bands such as Wilco, The Shins, Arcade Fire, The Decemberists, Dashboard Confessional, Bright Eyes, White Stripes, and Lupe Fiasco, calling them "as good—and often better—as the music of ... Rock's so-called golden age."

=== Scouting ===
In August 2008, Malone led a group of twenty Boy Scouts and troop leaders from Troop 466 in the Sunnyvale, California area on a 56-mile trek on horseback from Fort Reno, Oklahoma to Enid, Oklahoma. Malone said that he wanted to find another unique experience, after having previously taken Scouts in his troop on a 192-mile hike across England.

== Publications ==
- The Craft of Professional Writing: A Guide for Amateur and Professional Writers, Anthem Press, July 2018, ISBN 978-1-78308830-0
- Four Percent: The Extraordinary Story of Exceptional American Youth, Windrush Publishers, 2015, ISBN 978-0-98590975-8
- Team Genius: The New Science of High-Performing Organizations, Harper Business, 2015. ISBN 978-0-06-230254-0
- Intel Trinity: How Robert Noyce, Gordon Moore, and Andy Grove Built the World's Most Important Company, Harper Business, July 15, 2014, ISBN 978-0-06-222676-1
- The Guardian of All Things: The Epic Story of Human Memory, St. Martin's Press, 2012, ISBN 9780312620318
- No Size Fits All: From Mass Marketing to Mass Handselling, with Tom Hayes, Penguin/Portfolio Hardcover, 2009, ISBN 978-1-59184-267-5
- The Future Arrived Yesterday: The Rise of the Protean Corporation and What It Means for You, Crown Business, 2009, ISBN 978-0-307-40690-3
- Bill & Dave: How Hewlett and Packard Built the World's Greatest Company, Portfolio Hardcover, 2007, ISBN 978-1-59184-152-4
- The Valley of Heart's Delight: A Silicon Valley Notebook, 1963–2001, Wiley, 2002, ISBN 978-0-471-20191-5
- Betting It All: The Entrepreneurs of Technology, Wiley, 2001, ISBN 978-0-471-20190-8
- Big Issues: The Examined Life in a Digital Age, Wiley, 2001, ISBN 0-471-41491-3
- Infinite Loop: How the World's Most Insanely Great Computer Company Went Insane, Aurum Press Ltd., 2000, ISBN 978-1-85410-693-3
- Intellectual Capital: Realizing Your Company's True Value by Finding Its Hidden Brainpower, by Leif Edvinsson and Michael S. Malone, Harpercollins, 1997, ISBN 978-0-88730-841-3
- Virtual Selling: Going Beyond the Automated Sales Force to Achieve Total Sales Quality, by Michael S. Malone and Thomas M. Siebel, Free Press, 1996, ISBN 0-684-82287-3
- The Microprocessor: A Biography, Springer, 1995, ISBN 978-0-387-94342-8
- The Virtual Corporation: Structuring and Revitalizing the Corporation for the 21st Century, by William H. Davidow and Michael S. Malone, Harpercollins, 1992, ISBN 978-0-88730-593-1
- Going Public: MIPS Computer and the Entrepreneurial Dream, Harper Perennial, 1992, ISBN 978-0-06-098106-8
- The Big Score: The Billion Dollar Story of Silicon Valley, Doubleday, 1985, ISBN 978-0-385-18351-2
