= Pacbase =

Fourth-generation programming language

IBM VisualAge Pacbase is a code-switching structured programming language that is developed and maintained by IBM. VisualAge Pacbase runs on both IBM and non-IBM mainframes and integrates with IBM WebSphere Studio Application Developer. When compiling Pacbase code it is first translated into COBOL and then compiled to binary.

PACBASE was an early advanced computer-aided software engineering (CASE) software for mainframes and Unix systems from CGI (Compagnie Générale d'Informatique, a French software house) that supported a wide variety of databases, including DB2 and Oracle. PACBASE generated COBOL code for the servers, and Visual Age for PACBASE was used to create the client side. IBM purchased CGI in the early 1990s and absorbed the code-generating tools into its other offerings.

Pacbase is now considered a legacy system; its main remaining use is in Francophone markets. IBM supported Pacbase through 2015.

More details on the French page of VisualAge Pacbase.
