= Object Technology International =

Software company in Canada

- Founded: 1988
- Defunct: 2003
- Successor: IBM
- Headquarters: Ottawa, Ontario, Canada
- Products: VisualAge line Smalltalk and Java development tools
- Parent: IBM

Object Technology International (OTI) was founded in Ottawa, Ontario (Canada) in 1988 and acquired by IBM in 1996. OTI, in conjunction with the IBM development lab in Cary, NC, developed the VisualAge line Smalltalk and Java development tools, that eventually culminated in the open source Eclipse tool platform and integrated development environment (IDE).

OTI continued to operate with many of the same employees as it did when it was purchased by IBM until 2003–2004, when it was gradually disbanded as a distinct entity and its remaining employees absorbed into IBM.
