= Development of Windows 95 =

Development of the 1995 iteration of Windows

The development of Windows 95 (codenamed Chicago) began around March 1992, just after the release of Windows 3.1 and designed to be the successor to both Windows 3.1 and Microsoft's text-based MS-DOS. At this time, Windows for Workgroups 3.11 and Windows NT 3.1 were still in development at Microsoft. Windows 95 was eventually released to manufacturing on July 14, 1995, and generally to retail on August 24, 1995.

== Background ==
So if in a few years users find themselves in front of an Intel microprocessor-based PC, with a mouse in hand, staring at a graphical user interface on a high-resolution monitor, they can just blame Microsoft.

— Computerworld, 1987

During the initial design and planning of Windows 95 in 1992, Microsoft's strategy was to have a next generation, high-end OS based on Windows NT, namely, Cairo, and a low-end, consumer-focused one as an evolution of Windows 3.1. The latter strategy was to develop a 32-bit underlying kernel and filesystem with 32-bit protected mode device drivers in Windows for Workgroups 3.11, to be used as the basis for the next version of Windows, code named "Chicago". Cairo would be Microsoft's next-generation operating system based on Windows NT featuring a new user interface and an object-based file system, but it was not planned to be shipped before 1994 (Cairo would never be shipped, however, although elements from the Cairo project would eventually ship in late July 1996 in Windows NT 4.0, without the object-based file system, which would later evolve into WinFS).

Simultaneously with Windows 3.1's release, IBM started shipping OS/2 2.0. Microsoft realized they were in need of an updated version of Windows that could support 32-bit applications and preemptive multitasking, but could still run on low-end hardware (Windows NT, requiring 12 MB RAM and 75 MB disk space, did not). Initially, the "Chicago" team did not know how the product would be packaged. Initial thoughts were there might be two products, MS-DOS 7, which would just be the underlying OS, an evolution of the Windows for Workgroups 3.11 kernel, with a character mode OS on top, and a fully integrated graphical Windows OS. But soon into the project, the idea of MS-DOS 7 was abandoned and the decision was made to develop only an integrated graphical OS Windows "Chicago".

== History ==
The Chicago project was led by Brad Silverberg, who, at that time, was senior vice president of the personal systems division at Microsoft. Microsoft's product plan looked as follows:

| Codename | Planned release date | Description | Released as |
|---|---|---|---|
| "Astro" | September 1992 | Upgrade to MS-DOS 5.0, adding third-party tools to surpass DR-DOS 6.0 in features. | MS-DOS 6.0 |
| "Winball", "Sparta" | October 1992 | Windows 3.1 with network support. | Windows for Workgroups 3.1 |
| "Jaguar" | June 1993 | Next major release of real-mode MS-DOS, better integrating with Windows | MS-DOS 7.0 (Windows 95 MS-DOS Mode) |
| "Cougar" | June 1993 | A 32-bit protected-mode MS-DOS kernel based on Windows' 386 enhanced-mode kernel | Windows 95 VMM |
| "Panther" | June 1993 | The 32-bit Windows subsystem that could run on top of "Cougar" implementing a subset of Windows NT's Win32 API, but a superset of the Win32s API. | Windows 95 |
| "Rover" | June 1993 | Windows for Mobile Computing, based on "Panther" | Windows for Pen Computing 2.0/WinPad (unreleased) |
| NT, NT OS/2, "Razzle" | July 1993 | A new version of Windows built from the ground up as an operating system for servers and workstations. | Windows NT 3.1 |
| "Bombay" | December 1993 | An update to Windows 3.1. | Windows 3.11 |
| "Snowball" | February 1994 | Windows for Workgroups 3.1 with upgrades. | Windows for Workgroups 3.11 |
| "Daytona" | September 1994 | Successor to Windows NT 3.1. | Windows NT 3.5 |
| "Cairo" | July 1996 | An operating system with an object-based file system and a new user interface shell ported from Windows 95. | Elements of Cairo were shipped in Windows NT 4.0, minus the object-based file system. |
| "Cleveland", "Nashville" | August 1996 | A new version of Windows 95 (build 999, also referred to as Windows 96) focusing on the tight integration of Windows and Internet Explorer was expected to be released, but has not been confirmed. | Cancelled; codename reused for Windows Desktop Update, which shipped with most of Nashville's features. |

Prior to the official release, the American public was given a chance to preview Windows 95 in the Windows 95 Preview Program. For US$19.95, users were sent a set of 3.5-inch floppy diskettes that would install Windows 95 either as an upgrade to Windows 3.1x or as a fresh install on a clean computer. Users who bought into the program were also given a free preview of The Microsoft Network (MSN), the online service that Microsoft launched with Windows 95. During the preview period Microsoft established various electronic distribution points for promotional and technical documentation on Chicago including a detailed document for media reviewers describing the new system highlights. The preview versions expired in November 1995, after which the user would have to purchase their own copy of the final version of Windows 95.

== Notable beta milestones ==
Several Windows 95 betas were released before the final launch:

| Build | Description | Startup screenshot | Desktop screenshot |
|---|---|---|---|
| 58s | Build 58s was the first available build of Chicago, dated August 10, 1993. An even earlier build dating from July 20, 1992 has been known to exist, however it is mostly similar to Windows for Workgroups 3.1, making it hard to confirm. It introduced a Start menu prototype, which was divided up into three buttons containing different menus. Future Chicago builds combined these three into the Start button that is still recognized today. Build 58s included a new File Manager, Chicago Explorer, which remained relatively unchanged in the initial version of Windows 95 and in Windows NT 4.0. Build 58s still included Program Manager as found in Windows 3.1, although this application was supplemented by the new desktop and taskbar/Start menu designs. This build also introduced shortcuts (Chicago referred to them as Links) and native right click functionality, which Windows 3.1 lacked. It also introduced long file name support. | | |
| 73g | Build 73g is the next leaked build of Chicago with a date of December 2, 1993, however the boot screen has a date of November 1993. It is mostly the same as build 58s, with a few UI tweaks and a network logon box at startup. The taskbar also displayed currently running programs much like the final version of Windows 95 alongside its resulting buttons above the taskbar on the desktop. | The Windows Chicago Build 73 boot screen. | A screenshot of the Windows Chicago build 73 desktop. |
| 81 | Build 81 follows build 73g. The date stamp is from January 19, 1994; the boot screen still has the same date of November 1993. The three start buttons are combined into one, and introduced the word "Start" to the button for the first time. However, the 8.3 filename limit that was in place at the time truncated certain Start menu item names (e.g. "Accessories" was read as "ACCESS~1"). Currently running programs are now displayed exclusively on the taskbar. The briefcase UI was improved. The My Computer item is displayed when opened as :drives, Network as :network, and Control Panel as CONTROLS. | The Windows Chicago Build 73 boot screen. | A screenshot of the Windows Chicago build 81 desktop. |
| 122 | Build 122 was the first version of Chicago to define itself as a Beta edition. There is a date stamp of June 9, 1994, but the boot screen says the date of May 1994. This build includes a few minor improvements such as a different "Under Construction" background, the arrow being removed from the Start button, and the removal of some Control Panel items. There were also other interface updates (e.g. title of the My Computer, Control Panel, and Network windows are now correct). The tips that would appear in the windows actually slide from right to left on the taskbar, starting from the clock and bouncing against the start button a few times. These get reset when opening-then-closing a window. | | |
| 189 | Build 189 is the first version to call itself Windows 95. The date stamp is marked September 21, 1994. The UI has been completely revamped to the final version’s look-and-feel, except for few small left-overs from Chicago. The Start menu also slightly differs from later builds of Windows 95, as there is actually color along the side. The default background picture in this build is a new bitmap wallpaper seen during the setup process that was introduced eight builds prior, replacing the "Under Construction" background seen in build 122. It is an early darker-colored version of the one seen in the final build of Windows 95 during setup, which was also reused for Windows NT 3.51 and Windows NT 4.0. | | |
| 224 | Build 224 is the Beta 2 version of Windows 95. Only a date stamp of November 3, 1994, can be found as information on this build. | | |
| 347 | Build 347 is the Windows 95 "Final Beta Release". It was released in multiple languages. This version has a date stamp of March 17, 1995. | The startup screen from build 347. | |
| 468 | Build 468 is the May Test Release version of Windows 95, with a date stamp of May 11, 1995. The final startup – dubbed The Microsoft Sound – and shutdown sounds made their appearances a few builds prior, after the Windows 95 "Final Beta Release". | The startup screen from build 468, 480, 490 and 501 (490 and 501 are June test release, but with the same startup screen indicating "June test release" under the Windows 95 logo instead of "May test release"). | |
| 480 | Build 480 is a May Test Release dated May 24, 1995. It was released in two languages: English and German. | The startup screen from build 468, 480, 490 and 501 (490 and 501 are June test release, but with the same startup screen indicating "June test release" under the Windows 95 logo instead of "May test release"). | |
| 490 (RC1) | Build 490 is a June Test Release dated June 8, 1995. It was the official Release Candidate 1 build of Windows 95. | | |
| 501 (RC1) | Build 501 is a June Test Release dated June 21, 1995. It was one of the final builds of Release Candidate 1. | | |
