= Tom Hayes (author) =

American marketing executive

- Born: 1960 (age 65–66); Fort Benning, Georgia
- Education: Boston University
- Occupations: Marketing executive, author, blogger

Tom Hayes is an American marketing executive, and is the founder of Joint Venture: Silicon Valley, a public-private economic consultancy and think tank. Hayes formerly worked as an executive at Applied Materials, Inc. He is the author of two books on digital business and culture: Jump Point: How Network Culture is Revolutionizing Business and No Size Fits All: From Mass Marketing to Mass Handselling. Hayes is a frequent contributor to the Wall Street Journal and the Huffington Post.

== Early life and education ==
Hayes was born at Fort Benning near Columbus, Georgia, but grew up in Lowell, Massachusetts. He attended Lowell High School where, as a student in 1978, he led a campaign to construct a new building for the school. Hayes attended and graduated from Boston University.

== Career ==
In 1992, Hayes founded and was chairman and CEO of Joint Venture: Silicon Valley, a public-private effort tasked with rebuilding Silicon Valley's struggling regional economy. The organization's work was the subject of the book, Grassroots Leaders for a New Economy. In 1996, Hayes pioneered what is widely considered to be the first online entertainment event - WEBSTOCK '96 - as "a combination TV show, rock concert and theme park." He joined forces with Melrose Place actor Andrew Shue, to combine the creative talents of MTV, Disney, Fox, and Nickelodeon for a 96-hour marathon event in conjunction with Rock the Vote and to benefit the charity, Do Something. Hayes also was an executive at Applied Materials Inc. throughout most of the 1990s.

In September 2015, Hayes was named Senior Vice President/Head of New Media at Paramount Pictures where he is responsible for new technology, new distribution, new content and new media talent.

== Publications ==
- Jump Point: How Network Culture is Revolutionizing Business, McGraw-Hill, 2008, ISBN 978-0-07-154562-4
- No Size Fits All: From Mass Marketing to Mass Handselling, Penguin/Portfolio Hardcover, 2009, ISBN 978-1-59184-267-5
