= Infinite Loop (book) =

1999 history of Apple Computer

- Author: Michael S. Malone
- Language: English
- Subject: Apple Inc.
- Genre: Non-fiction
- Publisher: Doubleday Business
- Publication date: 1999
- Publication place: United States
- Media type: Hardback, Paperback
- Pages: 608
- ISBN: 9780385486842
- OCLC: 39195307
- Dewey Decimal: 338.7/61004165 21
- LC Class: HD9696.C64 A8657 1999

Infinite Loop is a non-fiction book on the history of Apple Inc., written by Michael S. Malone and published by Doubleday Business in 1999. The book is named after Infinite Loop (street), where the company had its headquarters, which were located in the middle of Silicon Valley, at 1 Infinite Loop, Cupertino, California.

== Background ==
Infinite Loop was written by technology journalist Michael S. Malone and published by Doubleday Business in 1999. The book chronicles the history of Apple Computer from its founding in 1976 through the return of Steve Jobs and the introduction of the iMac in 1998.

== Reception ==
The book received generally positive reviews. In a review for Ars Technica, John Siracusa described Infinite Loop as a thorough account of Apple's history and praised its broad coverage of the company from its founding through the late 1990s, although he criticized the presence of typographical and factual errors in the published text.

Publishers Weekly described the book as an examination of Apple's rise, decline, and recovery, noting that the company's resurgence after Steve Jobs's return had overtaken some of the book's analysis by the time of publication.

In a review for Kirkus Reviews, the book was characterized as a critical account of Apple and its co-founder Steve Jobs, focusing on the company's internal struggles and corporate culture.
