= VisualAge =

Integrated development environment

- Developers: IBM and Taligent
- Initial release: October 12, 1993; 32 years ago
- Final release: 6.0 / April 30, 2007; 19 years ago
- Written in: Smalltalk (original); Java (later)
- Operating system: Cross-platform
- Available in: Multilingual
- Type: Software development
- License: Proprietary
- Website: www-01.ibm.com/software/awdtools/vacpp

VisualAge is a family of computer integrated development environments from IBM, which supports multiple programming languages. VisualAge was first released in October 1993. It was discontinued on April 30, 2007, and its web page was removed in September 2011. VisualAge was also marketed as VisualAge Smalltalk, and in 2005, Instantiations, Inc. acquired the worldwide rights to this product. IBM has stated that XL C/C++ is the followup product to VisualAge.

== Early history ==
VisualAge was created in the IBM development lab in Research Triangle Park, North Carolina, which was established in 1984 and had responsibility for application development tools. The EZ-VU dialog manager product, a personal computer derivative of the user interface elements of the ISPF 327x product was one of the first products in this family. The lab also had a group which was one of the early adopters of object-oriented programming technologies within IBM using an internally developed language called ClassC to develop applications with more sophisticated graphical user interfaces which were just starting to be widely available.

Eventually, the availability of usable implementations of Smalltalk for IBM PC-AT class machines allowed IBM advanced technology projects to experiment with Smalltalk. At about the same time, visual interface construction tools were coming up on the radar screens. Smalltalk research projects such as InterCons by David N. Smith of IBM, and Fabrik by a team at Apple led by Dan Ingalls were building interactive graphical applications built from composition of graphical primitives. Higher level construction of user interfaces was evidenced by other tools such as Jean-Marie Hullot's interface builder first done in Lisp and then evolved to become the Interface Builder tool in NeXTStep and Mac OS X. Such tools allow for building user interfaces by WYSIWYG composition of UI widgets which can be "wired" to each other and to application logic written in the system's native object oriented language, or possibly with no coding at all.

The original prototype which led to VisualAge was an attempt "to make something like the NeXT interface builder" within the Smalltalk/V development environment. By the time VisualAge was released as a product, much more emphasis was placed on visual construction of application logic as well as of the user interface. This emphasis was in part due to the "positioning" for "strategic" reasons of Smalltalk as a generator rather than a language within IBM's Systems Application Architecture.

=== VisualAge ===
The name "VisualAge" is the result of a contest between the members of the development team. After the initial release of VisualAge/Smalltalk the name VisualAge became a brand of its own and VisualAges were produced for several different combinations of languages and platforms.

This is the eventual total of supported languages, variously available depending on the platform: BASIC, COBOL, C, C++, EGL, Fortran, Java, Pacbase, PL/I, IBM RPG, and Smalltalk.

This is the eventual total of supported platforms, each of which support different languages: AIX, OS/2, i5/OS (formerly named OS/400), Linux, Mac OS X, Microsoft Windows, TPF, z/VM, z/OS (formerly named OS/390, MVS), and z/VSE.

In 1992, Apple and IBM cofounded Taligent, based upon Pink, an operating system with a mass of sophisticated object-oriented compiler and application framework technology from Apple. Pink became CommonPoint, the partnership was dissolved, and CommonPoint was absorbed into VisualAge starting with the Compound Document Framework to handle OLE objects in VisualAge C++ 3.5 for Windows. In February 1997, the first mass release of Taligent technology came in the form of the Open Class within VisualAge C++ 4.0. This bundled SDK adaptation includes CommonPoint's frameworks for desktop (infrastructure for building unified OCX or OpenDoc components), web (called WebRunner, for making drag-and-drop compound documents for the web, and server CGIs), graphics for 2D GUI, international text for Unicode, filesystems, printing, and unit tests. PC Magazine said "Now, the best of the CommonPoint technology is being channeled into Open Class for VisualAge. ... For sheer breadth of features, the Taligent frameworks are unmatched. An all-encompassing OOP framework has always proved a difficult ideal to realize, but VisualAge's Open Class Technology Preview is by far the most credible attempt we've seen.".

Most of the members of the VisualAge family were written in Smalltalk no matter which language they supported for development. The IBM implementation of Smalltalk was produced by Object Technology International which was acquired by IBM and run as a wholly owned subsidiary for several years before being absorbed into the overall IBM organization.

VisualAge for Java is based on an extended Smalltalk virtual machine which executes both Smalltalk and Java byte codes. Java natives were actually implemented in Smalltalk.

VisualAge Micro Edition, which supports development of embedded Java applications and cross system development, is a reimplementation of the IDE in Java. This version of VisualAge morphed into the Eclipse Framework.

Various members of the family have been replaced by products in the WebSphere Studio family of products. By 2005, Smalltalk specialist Instantiations, Inc. had assumed technical support responsibilities and been granted global rights to the IBM VisualAge Smalltalk product line and technology base. Instantiations continues to offer the “enhanced product” named VA Smalltalk (VAST Platform). The C, C++ and Fortran compiler on AIX, Linux and z/OS are renamed as XL C/C++ series.

== Releases ==
Applications designed with VisualAge C++ may be portable between target platforms without any code changes needed if VisualAge guidelines were followed. IBM also included additional tools and libraries in instances where portability was not possible without code changes.

=== OS/2 and Windows ===
- VisualAge C++ 3.0 (OS/2 and Windows)
- VisualAge C++ 3.5 (Windows 95/NT only)
- C and C++ Compilers for OS/2, AIX and Windows NT Version 3.6
- VisualAge C++ Professional 4.0 (OS/2 and Windows)
- VisualAge Generator Developer V3.1 for OS/2
- VisualAge Generator Server V3.1 for OS/2
- VisualAge for OS/2 1.0 (1993-10-12)
- VisualAge COBOL for OS/2 1.0 (1994-03-29)
- VisualAge for COBOL for OS/2 1.1
- VisualAge for COBOL for OS/2 1.2
- VisualAge for COBOL for OS/2, Version 1 Release 2
- VisualAge COBOL for OS/2 2.0
- VisualAge for COBOL Version 2.1
- VisualAge COBOL 2.2
- VisualAge COBOL Enterprise 3.07 (Windows only)

=== OS/400 ===
- VisualAge C++ for AS/400 V3R6
- VisualAge C++ for AS/400 V3R7
- VisualAge C++ for AS/400 V4R4

=== AIX ===
- VisualAge C++ Professional for AIX
- VisualAge C++ Professional for AIX, V5.0
- VisualAge C++ Professional for AIX, V6.0

=== POWER Linux ===
- VisualAge C++ V6.0 for Linux
- VisualAge C++ V6.0 for Linux refresh

=== POWER MacOS X ===
- VisualAge XL C++ V6.0 for Power MacOS X (10.2, 10.3)
- VisualAge XL C++ V6.0 for Power MacOS X (10.2, 10.3)
- VisualAge XL Fortran V8.1 for Power MacOS X (10.2, 10.3)

== See also ==
- IBM Cross System Product (CSP): an article which discusses IBM VisualAge Generator
- Source code in database
