= Kollective =

Kollective Technology Inc, formerly Kontiki Inc, is a cloud-based, software-defined enterprise content delivery (SD-ECDN) company headquartered Bend, Oregon, in the United States. Operating in 190 countries with locations across America, Europe and APAC, it employs 117 people around the world and provides its services to over 135 customers.

Kollective’s technology is characterized as peer-assisted because it uses a combination of central servers and peer-to-peer communications. The company’s software-defined network is used to distribute traditionally high-bandwidth video and software content to the edge of corporate IT networks.

Formerly Kontiki, the company rebranded as Kollective following a major restructuring of its products and services in March 2015.

== History ==
Kontiki (later Kollective) was founded in November 2000. From then to its acquisition, Kontiki raised $46.5 million in investment. In March 2006, the company was acquired by VeriSign (now Symantec) for $62 million in a cash deal.

Kontiki focused on the enterprise business, but during the VeriSign years, it also had a consumer-focused division, which was responsible for technology integration with products such as the BBC iPlayer.

In May 2008, VeriSign, as part of a divestiture, sold Kontiki to MK Capital for $1 million and 3.98 million shares (an undetermined fraction of the spun-out company). According to that report, the rumored price was $40 million. Since breaking away from VeriSign, the company focused on their enterprise business.

Kontiki raised another $10.7 million in funding in 2010. The round was led by MK Capital and joined by New World Ventures and Cross Creek Capital, an affiliate of Wasatch Advisors.

In March 2015, Kontiki rebranded following a merger with Kollective – an Oregon-based enterprise content delivery company. Kollective now has locations in Oregon, Silicon Valley, London, Singapore, Tokyo, Bangalore and Düsseldorf. The company’s product portfolio has since expanded beyond video distribution to include software distribution, operating system deployment and enterprise content delivery.

== Kollective leadership ==
Kollective brought on a new president and CEO, Dan Vetras, in May 2011. As President and CEO, Vetras oversees Kollective’s day-to-day operations globally and is involved in building long-term relationships with Kollective’s customer base.

Prior to joining Kollective, Dan was President and CEO of Visible Technologies., where he was responsible for opening European operations. Before his role at Visible Technologies, he was President and CEO of Talisma Corporation, managing the company’s merger with Moxie Software. Dan was President and CEO of Captura Software through its merger with Concur Technologies, where he was responsible for determining the company’s strategic direction and operation. Prior to this role, he was Vice President of Sales at Web Ex. Dan served IBM as vice president of worldwide consumer software sales upon its acquisition of Edmark Corporation, where he was vice president of consumer sales and channel marketing. He also spent seven years in sales management and business development positions at Lotus Development Corporation/IBM.

Other members of the executive leadership team include:

- Chief Financial Officer - Barry Harmon
- Chief Product Officer – Eric Nguyen
- Chief Technology Officer – John Wainwright
