= ScriptX =

Discontinued development tool (1990–1996)

ScriptX is a discontinued multimedia-oriented development environment created in 1990 by Kaleida Labs. Unlike packages such as Macromedia Director, ScriptX is not an authoring tool for creating multimedia titles, although it does come with a built-in authoring tool. Rather, it is a general-purpose, object-oriented, multiplatform development environment that includes a dynamic language and a class library.

The program was applicable for implementing client–server applications, as well as for authoring multimedia titles. ScriptX was designed in an integrated fashion, making it smaller, more consistent, and easier to learn than equivalent traditional systems available at the time (for example a C++ environment and class library).

== Software components ==
ScriptX is meant to be a complete platform for interactive multimedia. It has three major components: the Kaleida Media Player, the ScriptX Language Kit, and application development and authoring tools. ScriptX was designed to work across multiple hardware platforms and operating systems. Version 1.0 was released for Microsoft's Windows 3.1 and Apple's System 7.

The Kaleida Media Player allows developers to target a single application for the Kaleida Media Player instead of targeting specific operating systems like the classic Mac OS and Microsoft Windows. The Kaleida Media Player is used to play back ScriptX titles and it must be installed on a user's computer to run a ScriptX title.

== History ==
In December of 1993, DARPA and NSF awarded a research grant to a consortium formed from American universities, publishing companies, and the Apple Computer company. This consortium was called East/West Group because its members were drawn from both the East and West Coasts of the United States and it aimed to develop a new multimedia CD-ROM-based authoring environment for computer-based instructional material, based on ScriptX. However, the project soon encountered technical issues with the ScriptX technology, which exceeded the system requirements of many low-end machines which were expected to be used to consume the authored content; at the same time, it was increasingly becoming clear that the future was the Internet not CD-ROMs and Java had emerged as a commercially available environment for producing cross-platform applications which met the project's requirements, without the technical issues the ScriptX-based solution had encountered. Therefore, in December 1996, the research project was relaunched using Java as a platform and further development using ScriptX was abandoned.
