= Apple II (original) =

First model in the Apple II computer series

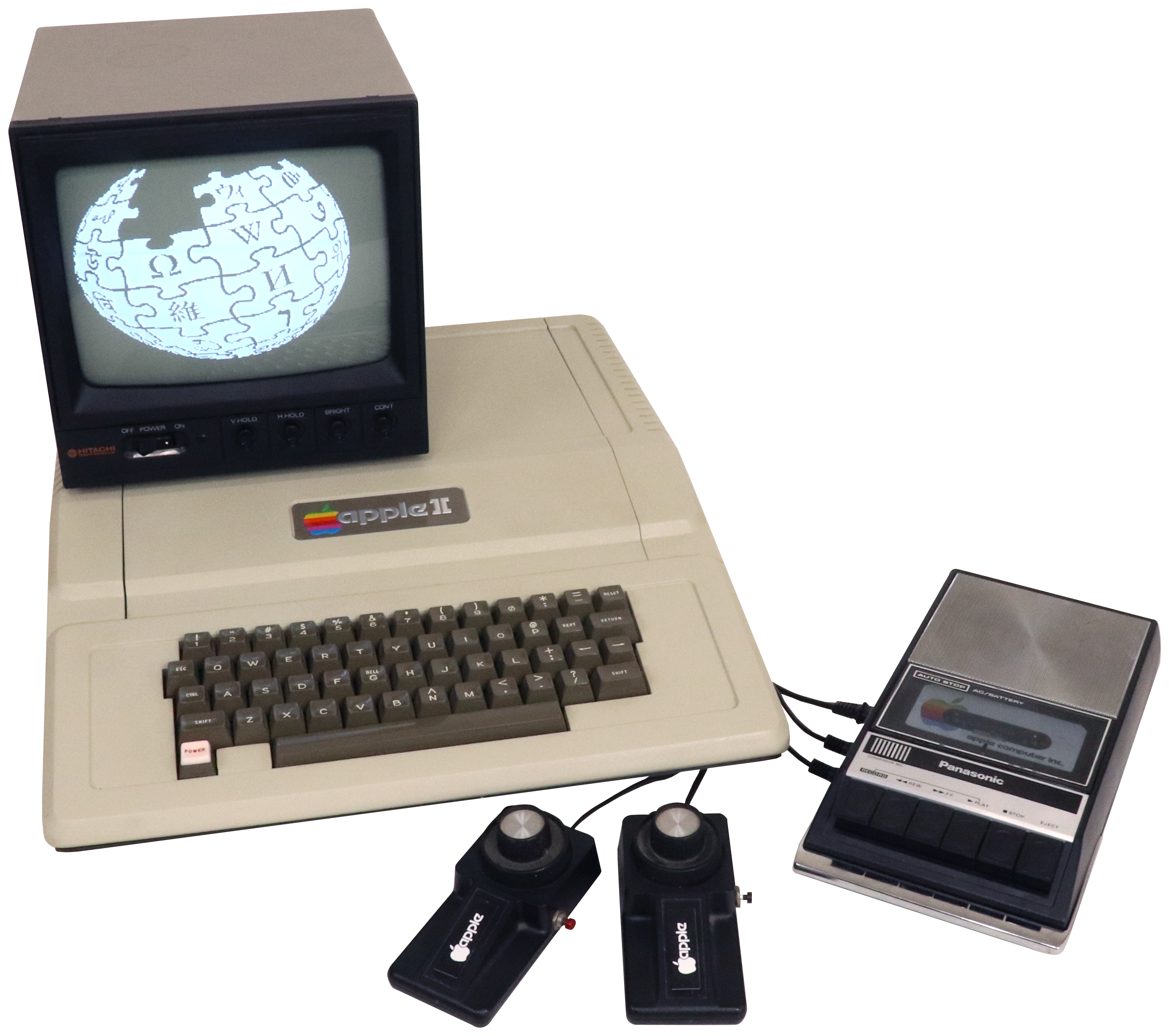
- A typical 1977 Apple II setup, with the included game paddles, a 9-inch monochrome monitor, and a recommended Panasonic RQ-309DS cassette deck
- Developer: Steve Wozniak (lead designer)
- Manufacturer: Apple Computer, Inc.
- Product family: Apple II
- Released: June 10, 1977; 49 years ago
- Introductory price: US$1,298 (equivalent to $6,900 in 2025)
- Discontinued: May 1979; 47 years ago
- Operating system: Apple DOS
- CPU: MOS Technology 6502 @ 1.023 MHz
- Memory: 4, 8, 12, 16, 20, 24, 32, 36, or 48 KB
- Storage: Compact Cassette; 5 1/4-inch 140 KB Disk II floppy disk
- Display: NTSC video out (built-in RCA connector)
- Graphics: Lo-res: 40 × 48, 16-color Hi-res: 140/280 × 192, 6-color
- Sound: 1-bit speaker (built-in)
- Input: Upper-case keyboard, 52 keys
- Controller input: Paddles
- Connectivity: Cassette input/output; Optional: Parallel port card, serial port card, SCSI card
- Predecessor: Apple I
- Successor: Apple II Plus, Apple III
- Made in: USA, using components from different countries

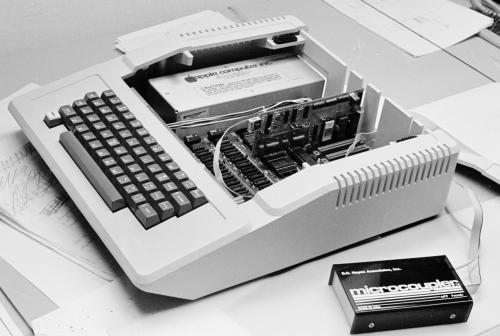
An Apple II computer with an external modem

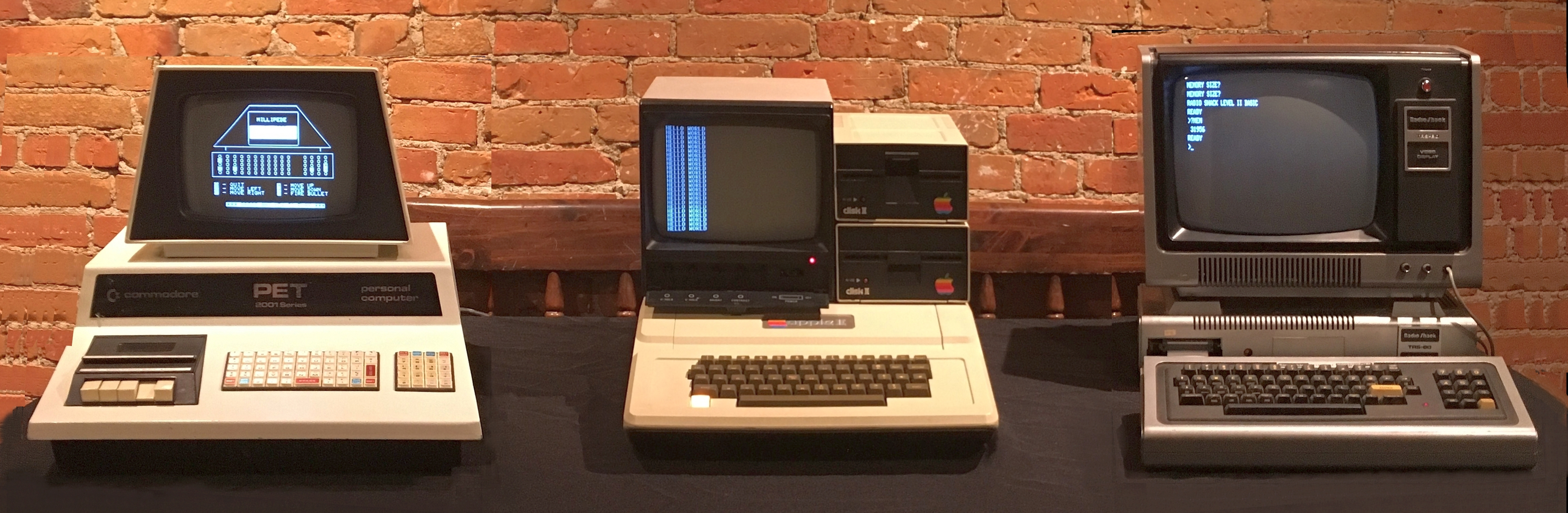
The three computers that Byte magazine referred to as the "1977 Trinity" of home computing: Commodore PET 2001, Apple II, and TRS-80 Model I

The Apple II (stylized as apple ][) is an 8-bit personal computer released by Apple Computer in June 1977. It was one of the first successful mass-produced microcomputers and is widely regarded as one of the most important personal computers of all time due to its role in popularizing home computing and influencing later software development.

The Apple II's initial electrical design was done by Steve Wozniak. The system is based around the MOS Technology 6502, an 8-bit microprocessor. Howard Cantin designed the printed circuit board, Jerry Manock designed the foam-molded plastic case, and Rod Holt developed the switching power supply. Steve Jobs was not involved in the electrical design of the Apple II, but contributed in its high-level design and positioning as a general-purpose appliance for consumers rather than primarily for hobbyists.

The Apple II was introduced by Jobs and Wozniak at the 1977 West Coast Computer Faire, and marks Apple's first launch of a computer aimed at a consumer market—branded toward American households rather than businessmen or computer hobbyists. Byte magazine referred to the Apple II, Commodore PET 2001, and TRS-80 as the "1977 Trinity". As the Apple II had the defining feature of being able to display color graphics, Apple's company logo was redesigned to have a spectrum of colors.

Apple introduced the improved Apple II Plus in June 1979, but continued selling the original Apple II as a lower-cost option until the end of 1980. Fewer than 65,000 units were sold. The Apple II began a series of computers that included the Apple II Plus, Apple IIe, Apple IIc, Apple IIc Plus, and 16-bit Apple IIGS. These models retained varying degrees of compatibility with the original Apple II. Apple discontinued the last model in the series, the Apple IIe, in November 1993.

== History ==
The Apple II was intended to be a successor to the Apple I. Steve Wozniak designed the Apple II circuit to have better capabilities than the Apple I, including color display. It was designed with an MOS Technology 6502 microprocessor running at 1.023 MHz (2/7 of the NTSC color subcarrier). The video controller displays 24 lines by 40 columns of monochrome, uppercase-only text on the screen (the original character set matches ASCII characters 20_{h} to 5F_{h}), with NTSC composite video output suitable for display on a video monitor or on a regular TV set.

Certain aspects of the system's design were influenced by Atari, Inc.'s arcade video game Breakout (1976), which was designed by Wozniak, who said: "A lot of features of the Apple II went in because I had designed Breakout for Atari. I had designed it in hardware. I wanted to write it in software now". This included his design of color graphics circuitry, the addition of game paddle support and sound, and graphics commands in Integer BASIC, with which he wrote Brick Out, a software clone of Breakout. Wozniak said in 1984: "Basically, all the game features were put in just so I could show off the game I was familiar with—Breakout—at the Homebrew Computer Club. It was the most satisfying day of my life [when] I demonstrated Breakout—totally written in BASIC. It seemed like a huge step to me. After designing hardware arcade games, I knew that being able to program them in BASIC was going to change the world."

By 1976, Steve Jobs had convinced product designer Jerry Manock (who had formerly worked at Hewlett Packard) to create the "shell" for the Apple II—a smooth case inspired by kitchen appliances that concealed the internal mechanics.

The first computers went on sale on June 10, 1977 bundled with two game paddles (bundled until 1980, when they were found to violate FCC regulations), 4 KiB of RAM, an audio cassette interface for loading programs and storing data, and the Integer BASIC programming language built into ROMs.

The Apple II's original retail price was US$1,298 (equivalent to $6,900 in 2025) with 4 KB of RAM and US$2,638 (equivalent to $14,020 in 2025) with the maximum 48 KB. The computer included two game paddles and a vinyl carrying case. For a time, Apple also offered the Apple II as a bare circuit board without a case or accessories, similar to how the Apple I was sold, for US$500 (equivalent to $2,660 in 2025) less.

To reflect the computer's color graphics capability, the Apple logo on the casing has rainbow stripes, which remained a part of Apple's corporate logo until early 1998. The Apple II was a significant catalyst for personal computers across many industries; it opened the doors to software marketed at consumers.

The earliest Apple II computers were assembled in Silicon Valley and later in Texas; printed circuit boards were manufactured in Ireland and Singapore.

== Overview ==
In the May 1977 issue of Byte, Steve Wozniak published a detailed description of his design, beginning, "To me, a personal computer should be small, reliable, convenient to use, and inexpensive."

The Apple II used several hardware design choices to reduce component count and cost. The 6502 processor accessed memory during alternate phases of its clock cycle, allowing the video circuitry to access memory during the otherwise unused phases without interrupting the video stream. This arrangement also refreshed DRAM through video memory accesses, eliminating the need for a separate refresh circuit or dedicated video RAM chips. The design relied largely on 74LS low-power Schottky integrated circuits, apart from the processor and a few support chips. To read the game controllers, Wozniak used a timer circuit built around a 558, a quad 555 timer IC, whose period varied with the controller's electrical resistance; software measured the interval using a loop. A single 14.31818 MHz master oscillator was divided by various ratios to produce all other timing signals for the processor, video circuitry, and color generation through frequency division. A jumper on the main board allowed users to select 50 Hz PAL or 60 Hz NTSC video timing.

The text and graphics screens have a complex arrangement. For instance, the scanlines were not stored in sequential areas of memory. This complexity was reportedly due to Wozniak's realization that the method would allow for the refresh of dynamic RAM as a side effect (as described above). This method had no cost overhead to have software calculate or look up the address of the required scanline and avoided the need for significant extra hardware. Similarly, in high-resolution graphics mode, color is determined by pixel position and thus can be implemented in software, saving Wozniak the chips needed to convert bit patterns to colors. This also allowed the ability to draw text with subpixel rendering, since orange and blue pixels appear half a pixel-width farther to the right on the screen than green and purple pixels.

The Apple II initially used compact cassette storage, like most microcomputers of the time. In 1978, Apple introduced the external 5 1/4-inch floppy disk drive known as Disk II, which connected through a controller card installed in an expansion slot. Designed by Wozniak, the card is regarded as an engineering masterpiece for using a small number of logic chips and an inexpensive PROM to create an interface with fewer components than conventional designs.

== Case design ==
The first production Apple II computers had hand-molded cases; these had visible bubbles and other lumps in them from the imperfect plastic molding process, which was soon switched to machine molding. In addition, the initial case design had no vent openings, causing high heat buildup from the printed circuit board (PCB) and resulting in the plastic softening and sagging. Apple added vent holes to the case within three months of production; customers with the original case could have them replaced at no charge.

== Circuit board revisions ==
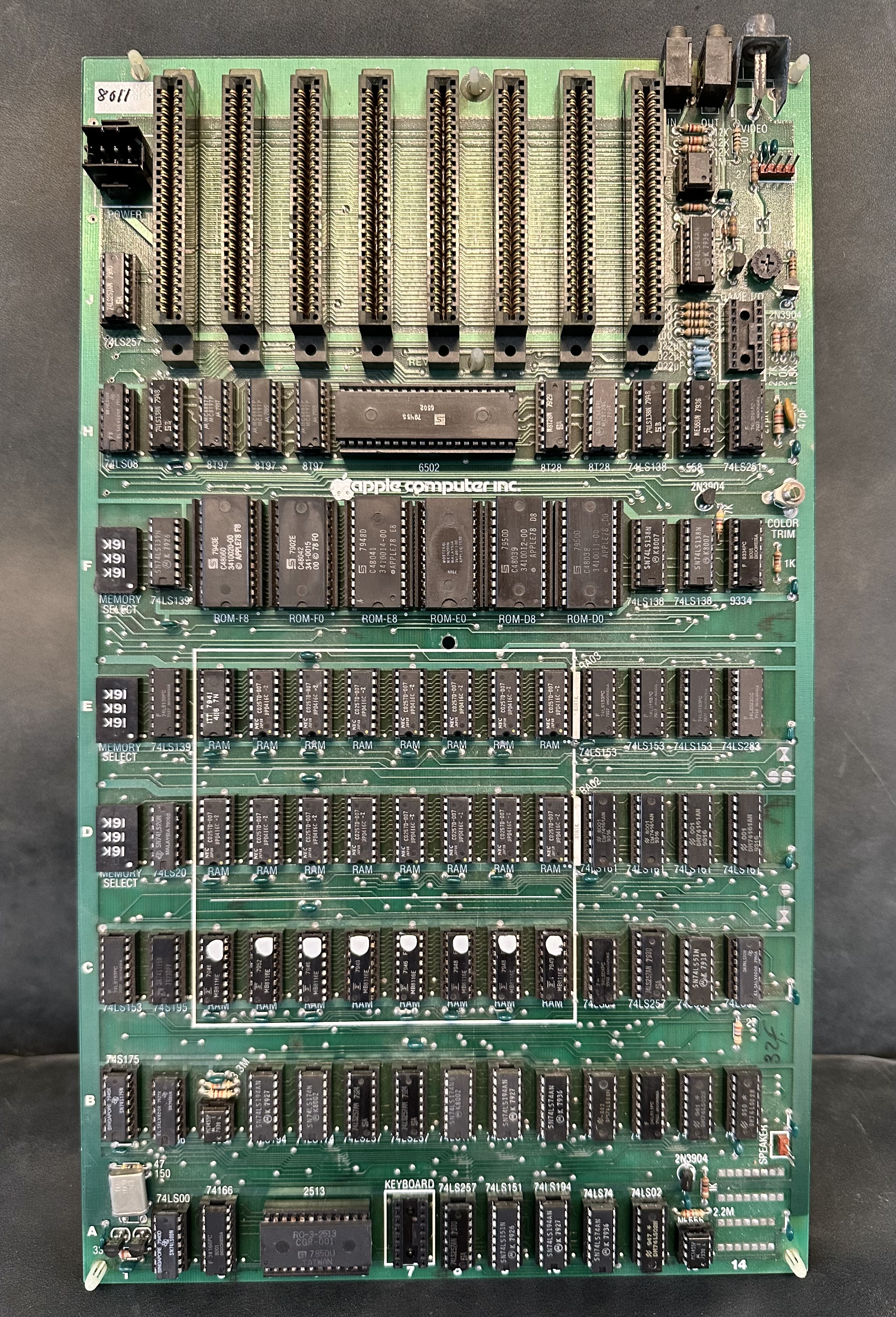
An Apple II circuit board from 1980. The white rectangle outline near the middle surrounds the three RAM banks, here all loaded with 16K × 1-bit DRAM chips.

The Apple II's printed circuit board (PCB) underwent several revisions, as Steve Wozniak and other Apple engineers made modifications to it. The earliest version was known as Revision 0, and the first 6,000 units shipped used it. Later revisions added a "color killer" circuit to prevent color fringing when the computer was in text mode, as well as modifications to improve the reliability of cassette I/O. Revision 0 Apple IIs powered up in an undefined mode and displayed random characters from memory on-screen, requiring the user to press Reset. This was eliminated in later board revisions. Revision 0 Apple IIs could display only four colors in hi-res mode, but Wozniak was able to increase this to six hi-res colors on later board revisions. (Technically it was eight, but only six were visible.)

There are many revisions of the Apple II circuit board, including revisions 0, 1, 2, 3, 4, 7, and updated versions that are compliant with FCC electromagnetic radiation standards, referred to as "RFI" revisions, including RFI revision 1, revision C, and revision D.

Apple II PCBs have three RAM banks for a total of 24 RAM chips. Original Apple II models had jumper switches to adjust the amount of RAM, with configurations of 4, 8, 12, 16, 20, 24, 32, 36, or 48 KiB. The three smallest configurations used 4K × 1-bit DRAM chips, while larger configurations used 16K × 1-bit chips or a mix of 4K and 16K banks; all chips within a bank had to be the same size. Early Apple II Plus models retained the jumpers, but as DRAM prices fell, Apple redesigned the circuit boards to eliminate the jumpers and accommodate only 16K × 1-bit chips. A few months later, Apple began shipping Apple II Plus models with the full 48 KiB of RAM.

Unlike most machines, all integrated circuits on the Apple II PCB were socketed; this cost more to manufacture and created the possibility of loose chips causing a system malfunction, but it was considered preferable to make servicing and replacement of bad chips easier.

The Apple II PCB lacks any means of generating an interrupt request, although expansion cards may generate one. Program code had to stop everything to perform any I/O task; like many of the computer's other idiosyncrasies, this was due to cost reasons and Steve Wozniak assuming interrupts were not needed for gaming or using the computer as a teaching tool.

== Display and graphics ==
Color on the Apple II series uses a quirk of the NTSC television signal standard, which made color display relatively easy and inexpensive to implement. The original NTSC television signal specification was black and white. Color was added later by adding a 3.58-megahertz subcarrier signal that was partially ignored by black-and-white TV sets. Color is encoded based on the phase of this signal in relation to a reference color burst signal. The result is that the position, size, and intensity of a series of pulses define color information. These pulses can translate into pixels on the computer screen, with the possibility of exploiting composite artifact colors.

The Apple II display provides two pixels per subcarrier cycle. When the color burst reference signal is turned on and the computer is attached to a color display, it can display green by showing one alternating pattern of pixels, magenta with an opposite pattern of alternating pixels, and white by placing two pixels next to each other. Blue and orange are available by tweaking the pixel offset by half a pixel-width in relation to the color-burst signal. The high-resolution display offers more colors by compressing more (and narrower) pixels into each subcarrier cycle.

The coarse, low-resolution graphics display mode works differently, as it can output a pattern of dots per pixel to offer more color options. These patterns are stored in the character generator ROM, and replace the text character bit patterns when the computer is switched to low-res graphics mode. The text mode and low-res graphics mode use the same memory region and the same circuitry is used for both.

A single HGR page occupied 8 KiB of RAM; in practice this meant that the user had to have at least 12 KiB of total RAM to use HGR mode and 20 KiB to use two pages. Early Apple II games from the 1977–1979 period often ran only in text or low-resolution mode in order to support users with small memory configurations; HGR not being near universally supported by games until 1980.

== Sound ==
Rather than a dedicated sound-synthesis chip, the Apple II contains a toggle circuit that can only emit a click through a built-in speaker or a line-out jack. More complex sounds, such as music or audio samples, are generated by software manually toggling the speaker at an appropriate frequency. This technique requires careful and precise timing, rendering it difficult to display moving graphics while sound is playing. Third party expansion cards were later released that addressed this problem.

A similar technique is used for cassette storage: cassette output works the same as the speaker, and input uses a simple zero-crossing detector as a 1-bit audio digitizer. Routines in machine ROM encode and decode data in frequency-shift keying for the cassette.

== Programming languages ==
Initially, the Apple II was shipped with Integer BASIC encoded in the motherboard ROM chips. Written by Wozniak, the interpreter enabled users to write software applications without needing to purchase additional development utilities. Written with game programmers and hobbyists in mind, the language only supported the encoding of numbers in 16-bit integer format. Since it only supported integers between -32768 and +32767 (signed 16-bit integer), it was less suitable to business software, and Apple soon received complaints from customers. Because Steve Wozniak was busy developing the Disk II hardware, he did not have time to modify Integer BASIC for floating point support. Apple instead licensed Microsoft's 6502 BASIC to create Applesoft BASIC.

Disk users normally purchased a so-called Language Card, which had Applesoft in ROM, and was located below the Integer BASIC ROM in system memory. The user could switch between either BASIC by typing FP or INT in BASIC prompt. Apple also offered a different version of Applesoft for cassette users, which occupied low memory, and was started by using the LOAD command in Integer BASIC.

As shipped, Apple II incorporated a machine code monitor with commands for displaying and altering the computer's RAM, either one byte at a time, or in blocks of 256 bytes at once. This enabled programmers to write and debug machine code programs without further development software. The computer powers on into the monitor ROM, displaying a * prompt. From there, Ctrl+B enters BASIC, or a machine language program can be loaded from cassette. Disk software can be booted with Ctrl+P followed by 6, referring to Slot 6 which normally contained the Disk II controller.

A 6502 assembler was soon offered on disk, and later the UCSD compiler and operating system for the Pascal language were made available. The Pascal system requires a 16 KiB RAM card to be installed in the language card position (expansion slot 0) in addition to the full 48 KiB of motherboard memory.

== Manual ==
The first 1,000 or so Apple IIs shipped in 1977 with a 68-page mimeographed "Apple II Mini Manual", hand-bound with brass paper fasteners. This was the basis for the Apple II Reference Manual, which became known as the Red Book for its red cover, published in January 1978. All existing customers who sent in their warranty cards were sent free copies of the Red Book. The Apple II Reference Manual contained the complete schematic of the entire computer's circuitry, and a complete source listing of the "Monitor" ROM firmware that served as the machine's BIOS.

An Apple II manual signed by Steve Jobs in 1980 with the inscription "Julian, your generation is the first to grow up with computers. Go change the world." sold at auction for $787,484 in 2021.

== Operating system ==
The original Apple II came with an 8 KiB ROM containing a BASIC variant called Integer BASIC as well as a resident monitor called the Apple System Monitor. Initially, only cassette tape was available for storage, which was considered too slow and unreliable for business use. In late 1977, Apple began to develop the Disk II floppy disk drive and required an operating system to utilize it. The existing standard at the time was CP/M, but due to incompatibility with the 6502 processor and a perceived clunkiness, Apple contracted Shepardson Microsystems for $13,000 to write Apple DOS. At Shepardson, Paul Laughton developed the software in just 35 days, a remarkably short deadline, even for the time. The Disk II and Apple DOS were released in late 1978. The final and most popular version of this software was Apple DOS 3.3.

Apple DOS was superseded by ProDOS, which supported a hierarchical filesystem and larger storage devices. With an optional third-party Z80-based expansion card, the Apple II could boot into the CP/M operating system and run WordStar, dBase II, and other CP/M software.

Apple released Applesoft BASIC in 1977, a more advanced variant of the language which users could run instead of Integer BASIC for more capabilities, such as the ability to use floating point numbers.

Some commercial Apple II software came on self-booting disks and did not use standard DOS disk formats. This discouraged the copying or modifying of the software on the disks, and improved loading speed.

== Third-party devices and applications ==
When the Apple II initially shipped in June 1977, no expansion cards were available for the slots. This meant that the user did not have any way of connecting a modem or a printer. One popular hack involved connecting a teletype machine to the cassette output.

Wozniak's open-architecture design and Apple II's multiple expansion slots permitted a wide variety of third-party devices, including peripheral cards, such as serial controllers, display controllers, memory boards, hard disks, networking components, and real-time clocks. There were plug-in expansion cards—such as the Z-80 SoftCard—that permitted Apple II to use the Z80 processor and run programs for the CP/M operating system, including the dBase II database and the WordStar word processor. The Z80 card also allowed the connection to a modem, and thereby to any networks that a user might have access to. In the early days, such networks were scarce. But they expanded significantly with the development of bulletin board systems in later years. There was also a third-party 6809 card that allowed OS-9 Level One to be run. Third-party sound cards greatly improved audio capabilities, allowing simple music synthesis and text-to-speech functions. Apple II accelerator cards doubled or quadrupled the computer's speed.

Early Apple IIs were often sold with a Sup'R'Mod, which allowed the composite video signal to be viewed in a television.

The Soviet Union radio-electronics industry designed Apple II-compatible computer Agat. Roughly 12,000 Agat 7 and 9 models were produced and they were widely used in Soviet schools. Agat 9 computers could run "Apple II" compatibility and native modes. "Apple II" mode allowed to run a wider variety of (presumably pirated) Apple II software, but at the expense of less RAM. Because of that Soviet developers preferred native mode over "Apple II" compatibility mode.

In 1978, Bob Bishop of Apple Computer, Inc. programmed 9 Apple II computers to run the gameboard on the TV game show Tic-Tac-Dough;. Each Apple was responsible for displaying various contents for each box of the gameboard (category, X, O, bonus game numbers and amounts, TIC, TAC or Dragon, as well displaying custom messages and an active screensaver), and in turn controlled by an Altair 8800 system. It was the first game show to use computerized graphics.

== Reception ==
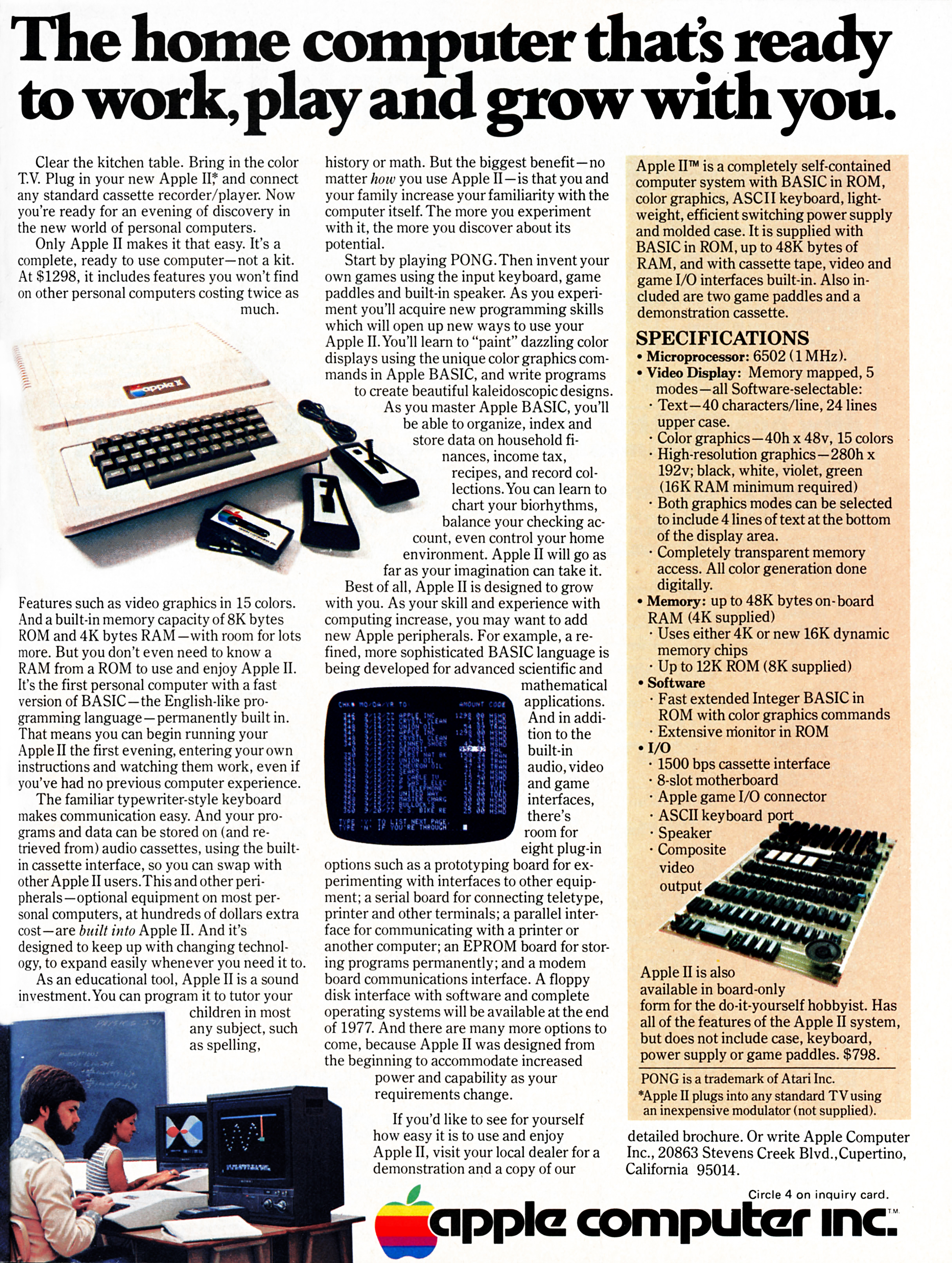
Advertisement for Apple II (1977)

Jesse Adams Stein wrote, "As the first company to release a 'consumer appliance' micro-computer, Apple Computer offers us a clear view of this shift from a machine to an appliance." But the company also had "to negotiate the attitudes of its potential buyers, bearing in mind social anxieties about the uptake of new technologies in multiple contexts. The office, the home and the 'office-in-the-home' were implicated in these changing spheres of gender stereotypes and technological development."

After seeing a crude, wire-wrapped prototype demonstrated by Wozniak and Steve Jobs in November 1976, Byte predicted in April 1977, that the Apple II "may be the first product to fully qualify as the 'appliance computer' ... a completed system which is purchased off the retail shelf, taken home, plugged in and used". The computer's color graphics capability especially impressed the magazine. The magazine published a favorable review of the computer in March 1978, concluding: "For the user that wants color graphics, the Apple II is the only practical choice available in the 'appliance' computer class."

Personal Computer World in August 1978 also cited the color capability as a strength, stating that "the prime reason that anyone buys an Apple II must surely be for the colour graphics". While mentioning the "oddity" of the artifact colors that produced output "that is not always what one wishes to do", it noted that "no-one has colour graphics like this at this sort of price". The magazine praised the sophisticated monitor software, user expandability, and comprehensive documentation. The author concluded that "the Apple II is a very promising machine" which "would be even more of a temptation were its price slightly lower ... for the moment, colour is an Apple II".

Although it sold well from the launch, the initial market was to hobbyists and computer enthusiasts. Sales expanded exponentially into the business and professional market, when the spreadsheet program VisiCalc was launched in mid-1979. VisiCalc is credited as the defining killer app in the microcomputer industry.

By the end of 1977 Apple had sales of $775,000 for the fiscal year, which included sales of the Apple I. This put Apple clearly behind the others of the "1977 trinity" of the TRS-80 and Commodore PET, even though the TRS-80 was launched last of the three. However, during the first five years of operations, revenues doubled about every four months. Between September 1977 and September 1980, annual sales grew from $775,000 to $118 million. During this period the sole products of the company were the Apple II and its peripherals, accessories, and software.

In 2006, PC World wrote that the Apple II was the greatest PC of all time.
