= Apple Writer =

Word processor for the Apple II

- Original author: Paul Lutus
- Developer: Apple Computer
- Initial release: 1979; 47 years ago
- Stable release: 2.1 / 1985; 41 years ago
- Operating system: Apple DOS, ProDOS
- Platform: Apple II
- Type: Word processor
- License: Freeware (1992)

Apple Writer is a discontinued word processor for the Apple II personal computers. It was created by Paul Lutus and published in 1979 by Apple Computer.

== History ==
=== Apple Writer 1.0 ===
Paul Lutus wrote Apple Writer, a word processor for the Apple II series of personal computers, alone in a small cottage he built himself atop a hill in the woods of Oregon, connected to the electricity grid via 1,200 feet (370 m) of cable strung in trees. Published in 1979 by Apple Computer after the company purchased the rights for $7500, the original version of Apple Writer runs from a 13-sector DOS 3.2 diskette and supports 40-column text display. It displays text entirely in uppercase, but case can be toggled by pressing the ESC key; characters that the user signified as uppercase appear in inverse (black-on-white) capitals, while characters in lowercase appear as standard capitals. The names of the binary files Apple Writer 1.0 produces begin with the prefix "TEXT".

The program's ability to print to printers using a game paddle port as a serial interface is an undocumented feature. Apple did not publicize the information due to the risk of damage to the computer or printer, but Lutus described how to build the serial cable in a letter to BYTE.

=== Apple Writer 1.1 ===
After Apple Writer became very popular, Lutus signed a new contract with royalties because, he said, "no one at Apple was able to make the improvements that were needed for the next version". He reportedly began receiving more royalties daily than the $7500 one-time fee Apple paid for the first version. Released in 1980, Apple Writer 1.1 supports Apple DOS 3.3's newer 16-sector format. It also features a spell checker known as Goodspell and some minor bug fixes.

=== Apple Writer II ===
Apple Writer II was released in 1981 and, like its predecessor, runs on DOS 3.3 on an Apple II Plus. Unlike the original, Apple Writer II can display both upper and lower case characters and, with a Sup'R'Terminal card in slot 3, supports both 40- and 80-column text. It also wraps text too long to appear on the current line rather than breaking it mid-word, and includes a glossary and the Word Processing Language (WPL), a macro-like resource that allows certain tasks to be automated. Apple Writer II files save as standard text files rather than binary files.

=== Apple Writer /// ===
This program was released in 1982 for the Apple ///, and uses that computer's enhanced capabilities.

=== Apple Writer IIe ===
Released in 1983, Apple Writer IIe supports the Apple IIe's 80-column display and full keyboard, and has the ability to create larger files, print files to disk, and directly connect the computer keyboard to a printer for typewriter-like operation.

=== Apple Writer 2.0 ===
Apple Writer 2.0 was released in September 1984 and is the first version of the series to run under ProDOS. It allows users to set screen margins and to connect the computer's keyboard to a modem as a rudimentary terminal program.

=== Apple Writer 2.1 ===
Published in late 1985, this version corrects a problem with parallel printer cards present in 2.0 and changes printed characters from low-ASCII to high-ASCII, correcting an issue with certain interface cards and printers.

=== Freeware ===
Following the success of AppleWorks, Apple discontinued the Apple Writer series. Lutus agreed in 1992 to make his program available on a freeware basis; it can be copied freely and given away, but cannot be sold for a profit.

== Interface ==
Apple Writer uses inline commands, so formatting does not appear on-screen; it appears when the document is printed. Paragraph formatting is specified with dot-commands, each of which requires its own line. For example:

.ff     form feed (new page)
.lmXX   set left margin to XX characters
.rmYY   set right margin to YY characters
.cj     center justification
.fj     full justification

Character formatting is specified with escape-commands, which varies depending on the printer. Common commands include Esc-X to begin underlining, and Esc-Y to end underlining.

== Reception ==
Apple Writer was very successful, with sales by Apple Computer of $1.5 million in the 16 months through May 1982. Lutus's royalties reached "six figures" in 1981 and were estimated to reach $250,000 in 1982. II Computing listed Apple Writer third on the magazine's list of top Apple II software as of late 1985, based on sales and market-share data.

David Thornburg of Compute! wrote in 1980 "I have looked at other text editors for the Apple, some of which were overloaded with features. Given the hardware limitations of the Apple II, I feel that Apple Writer is a very useful document creation tool", and stated that he wrote the review with Apple Writer.
