= Z-80 SoftCard =

Processor card for the Apple II

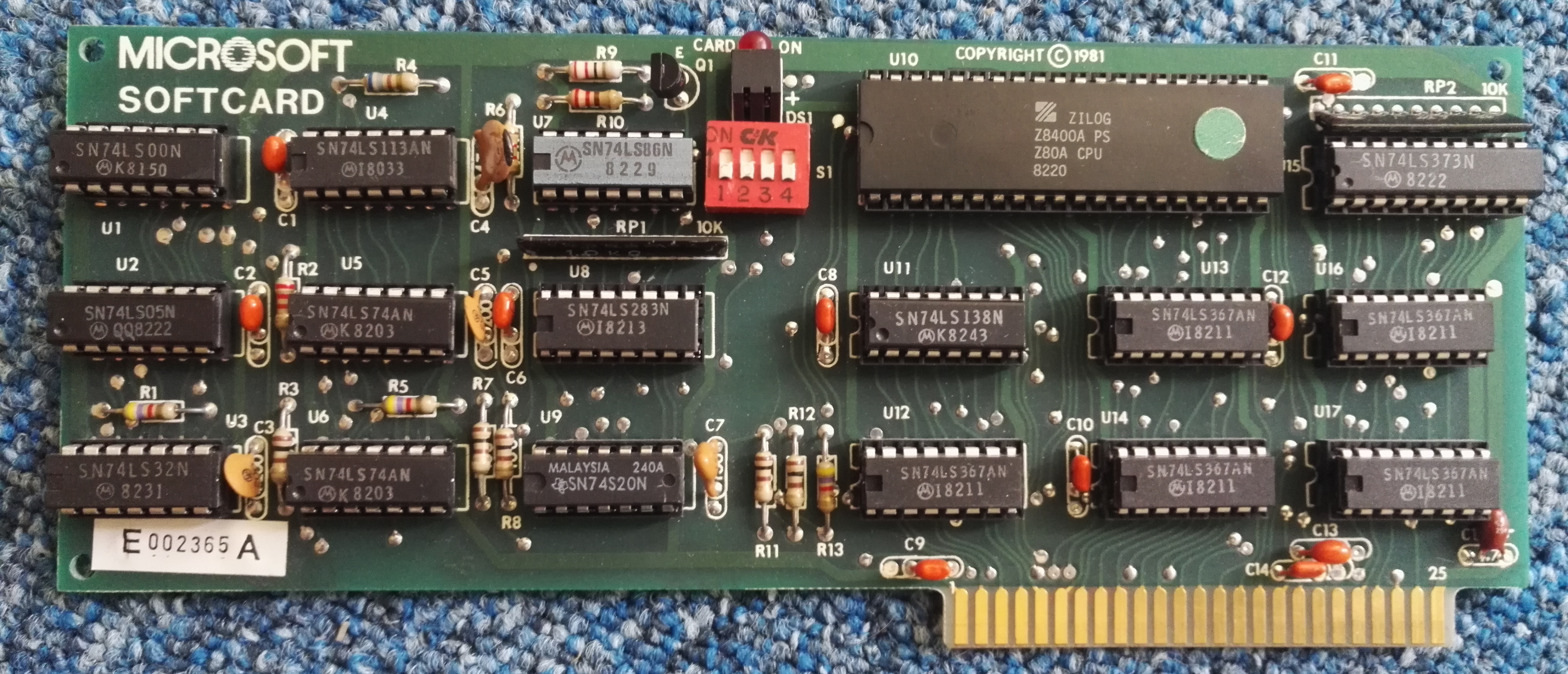
- Developer: Microsoft
- Released: April 2, 1980; 45 years ago
- Operating system: CP/M
- CPU: Z80
- Platform: Apple II
- Successor: Premium Softcard IIe

The Z-80 SoftCard is a plug-in Apple II processor card developed by Microsoft to turn the computer into a CP/M system based upon the Zilog Z80 central processing unit (CPU). Becoming the most popular CP/M platform and Microsoft's top revenue source for 1980, it was eventually renamed the Microsoft SoftCard, and was succeeded by Microsoft's Premium Softcard IIe for the Apple IIe.

== Overview ==
Released on April 2, 1980 as Microsoft's first hardware product, the Z-80 SoftCard is an Apple II processor card that enables the Apple II to run Digital Research's CP/M operating system. Although the computer in the 1980s already had among the largest software libraries, the card gives users access to WordStar and many more business applications, including compilers and interpreters for several high-level languages. CP/M, one of the earliest cross-platform operating systems, is easily adaptable to a wide range of auxiliary chips and peripheral hardware, but it requires an Intel 8080-compatible CPU, which the Zilog Z80 is, but which the Apple's CPU, the MOS Technology 6502, is not.

The SoftCard has a Zilog Z80 CPU plus some 74LS00 series TTL chips to adapt that processor's bus to the Apple bus. As CP/M requires contiguous freely usable RAM from address zero—which the Apple II does not have, since its own 6502 CPU's call stack and zero page and its text mode screen memory cannot be outside the lowest 4 KiB of RAM—addresses are translated in order to move reserved-RAM and non-RAM areas to the top of memory. The circuity is otherwise very simple, and uses little power. Microsoft recommended putting the card in slot seven; if available, it uses 80-column cards such as Videx or Sup'R'Terminal. SoftCard was bundled with CP/M and the Microsoft BASIC programming language. CP/M uses the Apple II disk format; users must convert data on non-Apple disks to the Apple format, or transmit it by cable from another CP/M system.

== History ==
The SoftCard was Paul Allen's idea. Its original purpose was to simplify porting Microsoft's computer-language products to the Apple II. The SoftCard was developed by Tim Paterson of Seattle Computer Products (SCP). SCP built prototypes, Don Burtis of Burtronix redesigned the card, and California Computer Systems manufactured it for Microsoft. Unsure whether the card would sell, Microsoft first demonstrated it publicly at the West Coast Computer Faire in March 1980.

Microsoft also released a version for the Apple IIe, the Premium Softcard IIe. The card has functionality equivalent to the Extended 80-Column Text Card, including its 64 KB RAM, so would save money for users who wanted CP/M capability, additional memory, and 80-column text. Its 2.26 BIOS has fewer bugs than the earlier card's, the CPU is three times faster, 32K of RAM is used as a CP/M print spooler, and the card uses its own firmware for 80-column display that is faster than Apple's.

== Reception ==
Compute! witnessed the SoftCard's debut in March 1980 at the West Coast Computer Faire, calling it "an Apple breakthru". InfoWorld in 1981 called the SoftCard "a fascinating piece of hardware". While criticizing the "computerese" of the CP/M documentation, the magazine wrote "if you need a lightweight, portable Z80 computer, the Apple/SoftCard combination is a perfect pair." BYTE wrote "the Softcard [is] an excellent buy ... The price is reasonable, and it works".

InfoWorld in 1984 also favorably reviewed the SoftCard IIe, approving of its ability to also replace the Extended 80-Column Text Card. The magazine concluded that it "is a good system among several good systems on the market", especially for those who wanted to run Microsoft BASIC or wanted functionality beyond CP/M.

=== Sales ===
The SoftCard's immediate success surprised Microsoft. Although unprepared to take orders at the West Coast Computer Faire, a Microsoft executive accepted 1,000 business cards from interested parties on the first day; Compute! reported that the company was "inundated" with orders. The SoftCard became the company's largest revenue source in 1980, selling 5,000 units in three months at $349 each, with high sales continued for several years. For a while, the SoftCard was the single most-popular platform to run CP/M, and Z-80 cards became very popular Apple II peripherals. By 1981 Microsoft, Lifeboat Associates, and Peachtree Software published their CP/M software on Apple-format disks, and Microsoft stated in 1982 that one fifth of all Apple IIs used the Microsoft SoftCard.

== Alternatives ==
Following Microsoft's success, several other companies developed Z80 cards for the Apple II as well, including Digital Research with Apple CP/M and a CP/M card developed by Advanced Logic Systems (ALS) named "The CP/M Card" (with a 6 MHz Z80 and 64 kB RAM) and Digital Research's CP/M Gold Card for CP/M Pro 3.0 (with 64 or 192 kB RAM). Clone cards are not necessarily compatible with the Microsoft original. Microsoft sued ALS in February 1982 for copying its BIOS.

MicroPro offered its StarCard for free to purchasers of WordStar and InfoStar. Other independent designs came from Applied Engineering, PCPI (with their 6 MHz Appli-Card), Cirtech, and IBS. There were also about a dozen SoftCard clone manufacturers.

Microsoft announced a SoftCard for the Apple III in June 1982, stating that it would be available in October.

The Xedex Baby Blue CPU Plus card provides similar functionality to the IBM PC, allowing that computer to run CP/M-80 software like WordStar; Baby Tex is the TI Professional version. The first version of the Diamond Computer Systems Trackstar, an Apple II emulation card for the PC, includes a Z80 and also supports CP/M.
