= Apple 80-Column Text Card =

The Apple 80-Column Text Card is an expansion card for the Apple IIe computer to give it the option of displaying 80 columns of text instead of 40 columns. Two models were available; the cheaper 80-column card has just enough extra RAM to double the video memory capacity, and the Extended 80-Column Text Card has an additional 64 kilobytes of RAM, bringing the computer's total RAM to 128 KB.

VisiCalc and Disk II made the Apple II very popular in small businesses, which asked the company for 80-column support, but Apple delayed improving the Apple II because for three years it expected that the unsuccessful Apple III would be the company's business computer. The 80-column cards were the alternative. The cards go in the IIe's Auxiliary Slot, which exists in addition to the seven standard Apple II peripheral slots present on all expandable Apple II series machines. Although in a separate slot, the card is closely associated with slot #3 of the seven standard slots, using some of the hardware and firmware functions that would have otherwise been allocated to slot 3, because third-party 80-column cards such as the Sup'R'Terminal had traditionally been placed in slot 3 on the earlier Apple II and Apple II Plus machines. Therefore the user can enter 80-column mode by issuing the command PR#3 or IN#3 in the BASIC prompt.

The "extended" version of the card features a jumper block (J1) that when installed enables the double high-resolution capability. Since early "Revision A" Apple IIe motherboards are incapable of supporting the bank switching needed for the enhanced graphics mode, the block needs to be removed to disable the feature.

As with many Apple II products, third party cards were also produced that perform a similar function, and some types of 80-column cards were available for the older Apple II models, which do not have a dedicated slot for this card.

Soon after the release of the Apple IIe, 80-column text support became a basic requirement of many software packages. Later, 128 KB (and therefore the Extended card) became a minimum requirement for major programs. All versions of the extremely popular AppleWorks require 128 KB of memory. In the later years of the Apple IIe, the Extended 80-column card was standard on all new machines. The Apple IIc and Apple IIGS, both released after the Apple IIe, also came standard with at least 128 KB of RAM, the extra 64 KB of which can be accessed in the same manner as an Extended 80-column card.

== See also ==
- The M&R Enterprises Sup'R'Terminal — the first 80-Column Text Card for the Apple II
- Videx — manufacturer of the VideoTERM, an 80-Column Text Card for the Apple II
