= Apple II peripheral cards =

Apple II peripheral cards are expansion cards that work with the Apple II series of computers.

The Apple II line supported a number of different cards. The cards added to and extended the functionality of the base motherboard when paired with specialized software that enabled the computer to read the input/output of the devices on the other side of the cable (the peripheral) or to take advantage of chips on the board - as was the case with memory expansion cards.

All Apple II models except the Apple IIc had at least seven 50-pin expansion slots, labeled Slots 1 though 7. These slots could hold printed circuit board cards with double-sided edge connectors, 25 "fingers" on each side, with 100 mil (0.1 inch) spacing between centers. Slot 3 in an Apple IIe that has an 80-column card fitted (which is usually the case) and Slots 1 through 6 in a normally configured Apple IIgs are "virtually" filled with on-board devices which means that the physical slots cannot be used at all, or only with certain specific cards, unless the conflicting "virtual" device is disabled.

In addition to the seven standard expansion slots, the following computers contained additional, largely special-purpose expansion slots:

- Apple II and Apple II Plus: Slot 0 (50-pin, for the firmware card or the 16 kB Apple II Language Card)
- Apple IIe: Auxiliary Slot (60-pin; primarily for 80-column display and memory expansion)
- Apple IIgs: Memory Expansion Slot (40-pin)

Perhaps the most common cards found on early Apple II systems were the Disk II Controller Card, which allowed users of earlier Apple IIs to use the Apple Disk II, a 5¼ inch, 140 kB floppy disk drive; and the Apple 16K Language Card, which increased the base memory of late-model Apple II and standard Apple II Plus units from 48 kB to 64 kB. The Z-80 SoftCard, making the computer compatible with CP/M software, was also very popular.

Both Apple and dozens of third-party vendors created hundreds of cards for the Apple II series of computers. These additional slots afforded great opportunities for expansion. In the 2000s, long after the last Apple IIe came off Apple's assembly line in 1993, a handful of manufacturers continue to market peripherals and expansion cards for Apple II computers, not counting students, hobbyists, and other Apple II users who continue to push the original machine to its limits.

== Categories ==
Apple II cards can be broadly divided into the following categories:

=== 50-pin standard slots ===
- Serial cards (RS-232 serial interface)
- Parallel cards (Centronics/IEEE 1284 parallel interface)
- Multifunction I/O cards
- Internal modems
- 80-column (or more) text cards (e.g., Videx)
- PAL color graphics cards (required for color graphics in early European Apples)
- RGB cards
- Floppy disk controllers
- Hard disk controllers
- Network adapters
- Co-processor cards
- Memory expansion cards
- Accelerators
- Realtime clock cards
- Music and sound cards
- Miscellaneous cards

=== Other slot types ===
- Slot 0 card (Firmware Card, Language Card)
- Apple IIc internal expansion cards
- Apple IIgs memory expansion cards (40-pin IIgs slot type)
- Apple IIgs accelerators
- Apple IIe auxiliary cards (60-pin auxiliary slot; 80-column cards, RGB, memory expansion)
