= Aox Inc. =

American technology corporation (1978–2007)

- Formerly: Aox Associates
- Company type: Private
- Industry: Technology
- Founded: 1978; 48 years ago in Waltham, Massachusetts
- Founders: Michael Aronson; Linda Aronson
- Defunct: 2007; 19 years ago
- Fate: Effectively defunct in 2000, dissolved in 2007
- Products: Expansion cards
- Number of employees: 45 (1998)
- Website: aox.com (archived)

Aox Inc. was a privately run American technology corporation founded by Michael and Linda Aronson in 1978. Over the course of its 22-year lifespan, the company chiefly developed software and hardware for IBM's PC and compatibles, for the Personal System/2 (IBM's intended successor to the PC), and for the Macintosh. In its twilight years, the company designed multimedia and teleconferencing devices and chip designs. Aox was founded after Michael Aronson graduated from Harvard University with a doctorate in physics; he stayed with the company until 2000, when he incorporated EndPoints Inc. and switched to full-time fabless semiconductor design.

== Corporate history ==
Husband and wife Michael and Linda Aronson founded Aox Inc. in Waltham, Massachusetts, in 1978. Founded as Aox Associates, the company's first product was MATE, word processing software for Z80- and 8080-based microcomputers running on top of iCOM Peripherals' or Technical Design Labs' floppy disk operating systems. Michael Aronson (born c. 1952) co-founded Aox after graduating from Harvard University with a doctorate in physics. His interest in computers grew through his post-graduate studies, the most illuminating being the computer analysis of samples of Napoleon's preserved hair for traces of arsenic—a hypothesized cause of Napoleon's death. Together with his wife Linda, Michael pooled money to start a business in the computer industry. The two named the company after their Afghan Hound, Aox. While operating Aox from his home, Michael moonlighted at Lifeboat Associates, a major distributor of software for the CP/M operating system based in New York, as a freelance developer.

While working at Aox from home, Michael developed a Z80 CP/M compatibility card for the IBM Personal Computer. He pitched the product to Lifeboat, who showed no interest in commercializing it. Unfazed by their rejection, Michael then pitched it to his co-worker at Lifeboat, Harris Landgarten, who coincidentally had a startup computer company of his own, Xedex. Xedex agreed to buy the rights to the product from Aox and named the product the Baby Blue. It proved fairly popular, as it opened up the IBM PC to a wide variety of productivity software already developed and tested for earlier CP/M machines. Michael then transitioned Aox into a full-time hardware company, developing and contracting the manufacture of upgrade boards and add-on cards for various personal computing platforms throughout the 1980s. After selling off the marketing and manufacturing rights of many of their upgrade boards to Kingston Technology of Fountain Valley, California in December 1992, Aox began winding down their commissions to contract manufacturers, instead pivoting to the role of a licensor of their new designs. Aox soon earned customers such as IBM, Hewlett-Packard, Sun Microsystems, and Apple Computer. IBM was Aox's largest customer in 1993; they briefly held equity stake in the company in 1990.

Rich Levandov, previously of Phoenix Technologies where he was a core developer of the PC-compatible BIOS that helped that company grow, was hired as Aox's vice president of business development in the late 1980s. Levandov shifted the company's add-on developments toward the direction of multimedia and teleconferencing, releasing an all-in-one communications card centered around an Analog Devices DSP in 1993. Aox's teleconferencing products debuted in January 1994. In March 1994, Apple hired Aox to develop cross-platform devices using Apple's GeoPort serial communication protocol, as well as contracting Aox to build a development kit for prospective peripheral manufacturers behind GeoPort. (Note: Previously, GeoPort peripherals were marketed solely by Apple.) The project came to fruition, with products released in August 1994.

Aox went from having 20 employees on their payroll in 1987 to 25 by the end of 1989. As part of their alliance with IBM, Aox grew to 35 employees in 1990. Between 1993 and 1998, Aox's workforce remained steady at 45 employees. In 1998, it saw sales of roughly $4 million. Aox ceased operations in 2000, with Michael Aronson and his other employees founding EndPoints Inc., a fabless semiconductor company, the same year. Aox existed as a company on paper until it dissolved in 2007.

== Product history ==
=== IBM Personal Computer ===
After 1982's Baby Blue, Aox developed a CPU upgrade card for IBM PCs and compatibles in September 1984. Designed by Michael Aronson and intended for PCs running Intel 8088s, this full-sized 8-bit ISA card comes equipped with an Intel 80286 and 512 KB of RAM, expandable to 2 MB of RAM. The card overrides the slower memory on the motherboard while working cooperatively with the 8088, the latter being relegated to handling I/O calls while the 80286 processes application data. The card was marketed and sold by Phoenix Technologies. In December 1986, Aox followed this up with the 386° Accelerator Card, a basic 16-bit CPU card containing an Intel 80386 running at 16 MHz with no wait states. Intended for PC/ATs or compatibles, which ran the Intel 80286, users could enable or disable the card's speedup on the fly through software, without needing to reboot. The 386° Accelerator Card received an overhaul in November 1987 in the form of the Master 386-16. This newer card is bus-mastered, allowing it issue direct memory access operations on other expansion cards on the AT motherboard without going through the CPU. The Master 386-16 also adds a socket for the 80387 floating-point unit and an addition socket for Aox's optional memory expansion modules, giving the system up to a total of 16 MB. To ensure compatibility with the timing dependencies of disk controllers designed around the 80286's clock, the Master 386-16 underclocks its 80386 during floppy seek operations.

The Master 386-16 itself received an update in January 1988 with the Master 386-20, which features a 386 with a faster clock speed of 20 MHz. The Master 386-20 updates the circuitry of its predecessor to patch a bug discovered by Intel with their 80387 FPU, in which some protected-mode applications (such as Unix) cause the machine to hang after issuing floating-point operations. Aox changed the form factor of their memory expansion scheme from modules to cards, occupying a slot of the AT's motherboard and connecting to the Master 386-20 via a ribbon cable. Both versions of the Master 386 received good writeups in InfoWorld, with Tracey Capen detecting no incompatibility with different software packages, while Stephen Satchell preferred it over Intel's Inboard 386. In November 1988, Aox released a i386SX-based upgrade board for ATs and compatibles; unlike their earlier solutions, Aox designed this board with a cable mating with the empty 286 processor slot on the motherboard of the AT.

=== IBM Personal System/2 ===
Aox's porting of the Master 386 concept from ISA to Micro Channel as used in IBM's Personal System/2 line in 1988 marked the beginning of Aox's close relationship to IBM and the PS/2, lasting until Aox sold the rights to the designs for their PS/2 upgrades to Kingston Technology in 1992. Announced in May 1988 and later dubbed the Micro Master 386, the first incarnation of this upgrade card family allowed the 286-equipped PS/2 Models 50 and 60 to be equipped with Intel 386 processors clocked between 16 and 25 MHz, as present in the PS/2 Models 70 and 80. With the release of this card, Aox was one of a handful of early Micro Channel card makers to implement bus mastering—seen as a major inherent benefit of Micro Channel but with scattershot documentation by IBM, to the chagrin of some third-party developers who could not take full advantage of it. (Note: For example, in 1988, Aox was only one of two third-party Micro Channel card makers known to implement bus mastering in their expansions. By 1989, that number had only grown to four.) A 33-MHz–based version of the Micro Master 386 was released in September 1989, as was with a sister card specifically for Zenith Data Systems's Z-248 PC compatible. (Note: Aox's Zenith-based Master card was likely developed due to the Z-248's large presence in federal offices, with 400,000 deployed in the United States in 1989.) Notable fleet buyers of the Micro Master 386 was the Sovran Bank of Virginia, who purchased 1,600 to upgrade their 286-based PS/2s, and Lithonia Lighting, who purchased 1,000 for their PS/2s.

Developed over the course of two years starting in 1989, Aox released OS/Master, a software package integrating with the Micro Master allowing users to run multiple operating systems simultaneously, in January 1991. Control and configuration utilities allows users to choose which processor in the system control which operating system; OS/Master supports more than one Master Micro card. OS/Master was one of two pieces of software developed by Aox in 1989, the other being a disk caching utility called Disk Quick released in September 1989.

In late 1989, IBM contracted Aox to develop a cooperative i486-based version of the Micro Master as the centerpiece of IBM's "Super Server" project, (Note: The "Super Server" project gave way to the IBM PS/2 Model 95 in 1992.) showcased in Networld February 1990 in Boston, Massachusetts, in a configuration comprising 16 networked modified IBM PS/2 Model 70s. This led to IBM investing an undisclosed amount in Aox to market the company's Micro Master cards in 1990, in exchange for the development of other cards that took advantage of bus mastering. Aox was an initial entrant in the Micro Channel Developers Association, along with 14 other companies including IBM. Before selling out their PS/2 upgrades to Kingston in December 1992, Aox developed i486-, i486SX-, and i386SX-based versions of the Master Micro, the latter being plug-in modules for 286-based PS/2s lacking bus mastering and marketed under the name Stax.

=== Apple Macintosh ===
On the Mac side, Aox introduced the Doubletime-16, an accelerator card for the Macintosh SE in January 1988. The Doubletime-16 contains a Motorola 68000 clocked at 16 MHz, double that of the Macintosh SE's native 68000, paired with a 68881 FPU. Like the Master 386, the clock speed increase of the Doubletime-16's processor can be switched on and off in software. MacWorld's benchmark of the Doubletime-16 measured an appreciable speed increase in database seeks and record skips. However, Journalist Charles Seiter called the pairing of the 68000 and 68881 as imperfect: while some applications like Excel could access the 68881 in this configuration (bypassing Apple's slower software-based SANE floating-point arithmetic standard), some scientific and engineering apps for the Classic Mac OS environment could only access the 68881 in tandem with the 68000's successor the 68020.

In August 1988, Aox had announced their first integrated circuit design: a proprietary graphics accelerator chip for the Mac and PC.

== See also ==
- Reply Corporation, another manufacturer of expansion cards and peripherals for the PS/2
