= Sup'R'Terminal =

The M&R Enterprises Sup'R'Terminal was the first Apple II peripheral card to enable the display of 80 columns of text on a connected monitor. The Sup'R'Terminal is compatible with slot 03 in the Apple II and II+. As the first card making 80 columns of upper and lower case text displayable on these machines, it is the only card supported by the II+ version of Apple Writer and thus the only way to see on a monitor the true layout of text as it will be printed on a page with this popular early personal computer word processor. The Apple II and II+ had until this time only displayed 40 columns of text per line, half the characters included per line on a standard letter-size printed page at 10 characters per inch. This transition to 80-column display was an early step in bringing the WYSIWYG concept to the Apple ecosystem.

A variety of clone add-on cards with similar functionality were released in the wake of the Sup'R'Terminal, including the Videx Videoterm. Apple's inclusion of their own card, the Apple 80-Column Text Card, with the Apple IIe nearly eliminated the third party 80-column card market.

== Development ==
The Sup'R'Terminal was designed by John R. Wilbur and the firmware was written by Andy Hertzfeld in 1980.
