= Apple II Plus =

Second model of the Apple II computer line

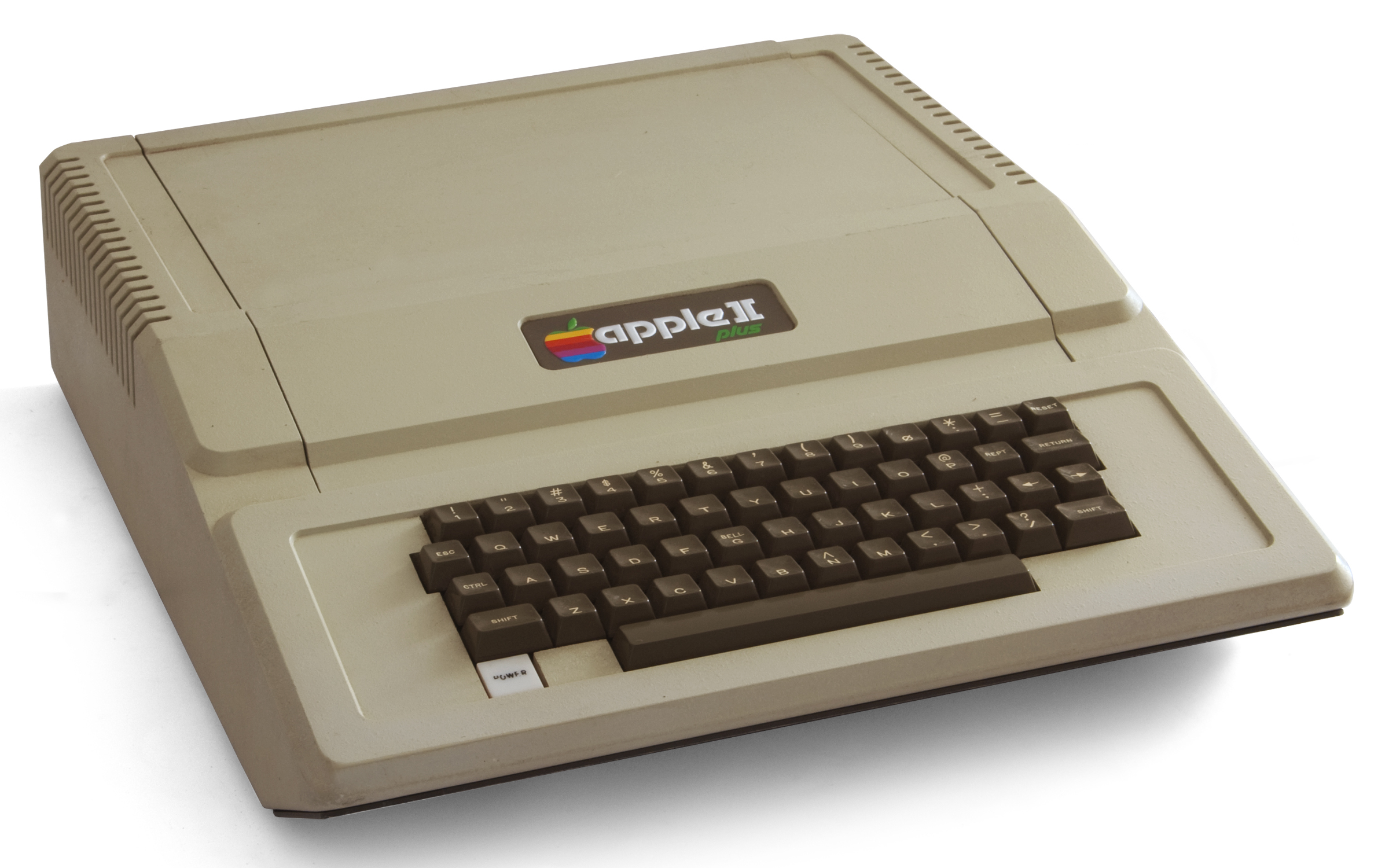
- Apple II Plus
- Manufacturer: Apple Computer
- Product family: Apple II
- Released: June 1979; 47 years ago
- Introductory price: US$1,195 (equivalent to $5,300 in 2025)
- Discontinued: December 1982
- Operating system: Apple DOS; Apple ProDOS; Apple Pascal
- CPU: MOS Technology 6502 @ 1.023 MHz
- Memory: 16, 32, or 48 KB
- Removable storage: Compact Cassette; 5 1/4-inch 140 KB Disk II floppy disk (optional); 3 1/2-inch 800K floppy disk (optional)
- Display: NTSC video out (built-in RCA connector)
- Graphics: Lo-res: 40 × 48, 16-color Hi-res: 140/280 × 192, 6-color
- Sound: 1-bit speaker (built-in)
- Input: Uppercase keyboard, 52 keys
- Controller input: Paddles, Joystick, Apple Mouse
- Connectivity: Cassette input/output; Optional: Parallel port card, serial port card, SCSI card
- Predecessor: Apple II (original)
- Successor: Apple III (intended), Apple IIe

The Apple II Plus (stylized as Apple ][+ or apple ][ plus) is the second model of the Apple II series of personal computers produced by Apple Computer. It was sold from June 1979 to December 1982. Approximately 380,000 II Pluses were sold during its four years in production before being replaced by the Apple IIe in January 1983.

== Features ==
=== Memory ===
The Apple II Plus shipped with 16 KB, 32 KB or 48 KB of main RAM, expandable to 64 KB by means of the Language Card, an expansion card that could be installed in the computer's slot 0. The Apple's 6502 microprocessor could support a maximum of 64 KB of address space, and a machine with 48 KB RAM reached this limit because of the additional 12 KB of read-only memory and 4 KB of I/O addresses. For this reason, the extra RAM in the language card was bank-switched over the machine's built-in ROM, allowing code loaded into the additional memory to be used as if it actually were ROM. Users could thus load Integer BASIC into the language card from disk and switch between the Integer and Applesoft dialects of BASIC with DOS 3.3's INT and FP commands just as if they had the BASIC ROM expansion card. The Language Card was also required to use LOGO, Apple Pascal, and FORTRAN 77. Apple Pascal and FORTRAN ran under a non-DOS operating system based on UCSD P-System, which had its own disk format and included a "virtual machine" that allowed it to run on many different types of hardware.

The first-year Apple II Plus retained the original Apple II's jumper blocks to select the RAM size, but a drop in memory prices during 1980 resulted in all machines being shipped with 48K and the blocks being removed.

=== CP/M ===
Shortly after the introduction of the II Plus in 1979, Microsoft came out with the Z-80 SoftCard, an expansion card for the Apple II line that allowed the use of CP/M and contained its own Z80 CPU and logic to adapt the Z80 CPU to the Apple bus. The SoftCard was extremely popular and Microsoft's single most successful product for two years, although on the downside, it was limited to using the Apple II's GCR disk format and thus CP/M software either had to be obtained on Apple format disks or transferred via serial link from a different machine running CP/M. The SoftCard shipped with CP/M 2.2 and a special version of MBASIC that supported a subset of Applesoft BASIC's graphics commands. Other third party CP/M cards for the Apple II offered additional memory, CP/M 3.0, and CPU speeds up to 8 MHz.

=== Onboard Applesoft BASIC ===
The II Plus had the so-called "Autostart ROMs", meaning that it will attempt to boot from disk on power-up. If no system disk is present, Drive 0 will spin endlessly until the user presses Reset (or Ctrl+Reset on machines with the Ctrl+Reset safety switch enabled) to enter Applesoft BASIC. If DOS has not been booted up, the user will only be able to load and save files to cassette from BASIC. The II Plus had a revised version of BASIC known as Applesoft II which incorporated most of the functionality from Integer BASIC, including HGR graphics commands.

Most II Pluses came with a "language card". This was completely different from the language card sold for the original II, which contained Applesoft BASIC in ROM. Since the II Plus already had Applesoft present in the ROMs on the system board, its language card contained RAM rather than ROM and if installed will boost the system to 64K. While on the original II, Integer BASIC resided in ROM at memory address $E000, this area contains RAM on the II Plus if a language card is present. Integer BASIC is not in ROM on the II Plus and is instead loaded by DOS 3.x during boot up into the RAM at $D000 (if a language card is present, otherwise this step is skipped--II Pluses without a language card cannot run Integer BASIC). Normally, the RAM containing Integer BASIC is banked out and the Applesoft ROM is present at $D000. If the user types "INT", Integer BASIC is activated by swapping out the Applesoft ROM and switching in the RAM with Integer BASIC. By typing "FP", Integer BASIC is switched out and Applesoft switched back in. The machine language monitor at $F800 may also be banked out for RAM.

=== Substitute lowercase functionality ===
Like the Apple II, the Apple II Plus has no lowercase functionality. All letters from the keyboard are upper-case, there is no caps lock key, and there are no lowercase letters in the text-mode font stored in the computer's ROM. To display lowercase letters, some applications run in the slower hi-res graphics mode and use a custom font, rather than running in the fast text mode using the font in ROM. Other programs, primarily those where both capitalization and text movement were important, such as word processors, use inverse text mode to represent text that would be uppercase when printed. Alternatively, users can install a custom ROM chip that contained lowercase letters in the font, or purchase one of several third-party 80-column cards that enable a text mode that can display 80-column, upper- and lower-case text. The Videx Videoterm and its many clones were especially popular.

For lowercase input, since it is not possible to detect whether the keyboard's Shift keys are in use, the common "shift-key mod" connects the Shift key to one of the pins on the motherboard's paddle connector. Compatible applications, including nearly all word processors, can then detect whether the shift key was being pressed. This modification involves adding wires inside the Apple II; Apple distributed literature on how to build it, however, assuring readers that it was "the most simple and least expensive addition anyone could do". Most applications that support lower-case letters can also use the ESC key as a substitute lowercase toggle if the modification is not installed.

=== Repeat key ===
The Apple II Plus, like its predecessor the Apple II, features a repeat key on its keyboard. The key is labeled "REPT" and is located just to the left of the "RETURN" key. The II Plus is the last Apple Computer to have this key, as later Apple computers would incorporate the ability to hold down a key for a period of time to repeat the key.

=== Electromagnetic shielding ===
The II Plus has a plastic case with a brass mesh running along the inside of the case. This mesh helped reduce the electromagnetic interference emitted from the computer, keeping the machine in compliance with newly implemented FCC regulations covering microcomputers. Small grids of plastic pins, and sometimes Velcro, were used to hold the case's top onto the computer. In comparison, the original Apple II lacked RF shielding and was often unusable with certain TVs and monitors (Apple recommended Sony TVs as they had better RF insulation than other brands).

== Variants ==
=== Apple II Europlus and J-Plus ===
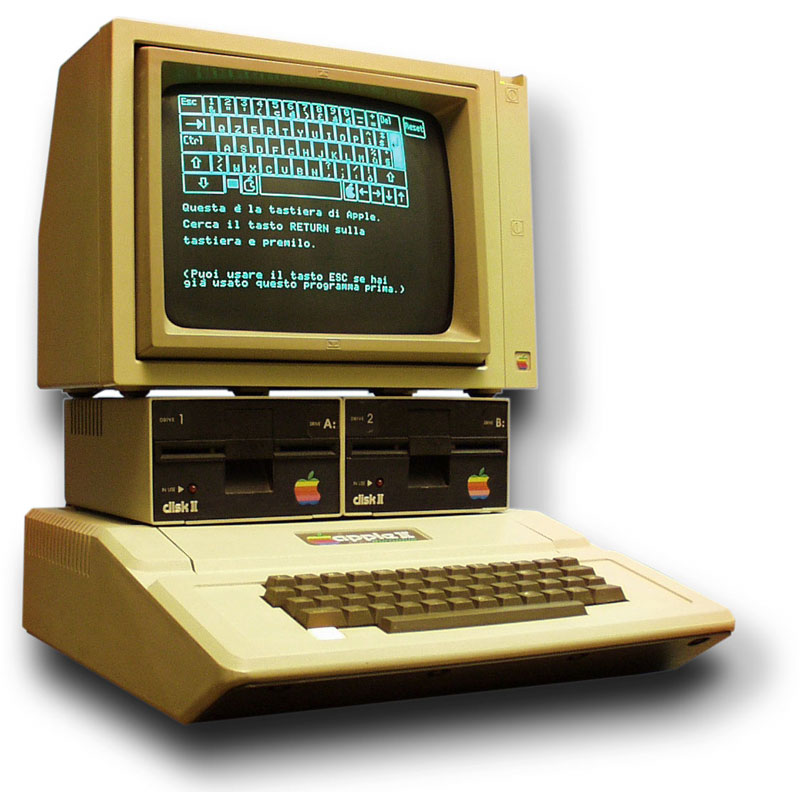
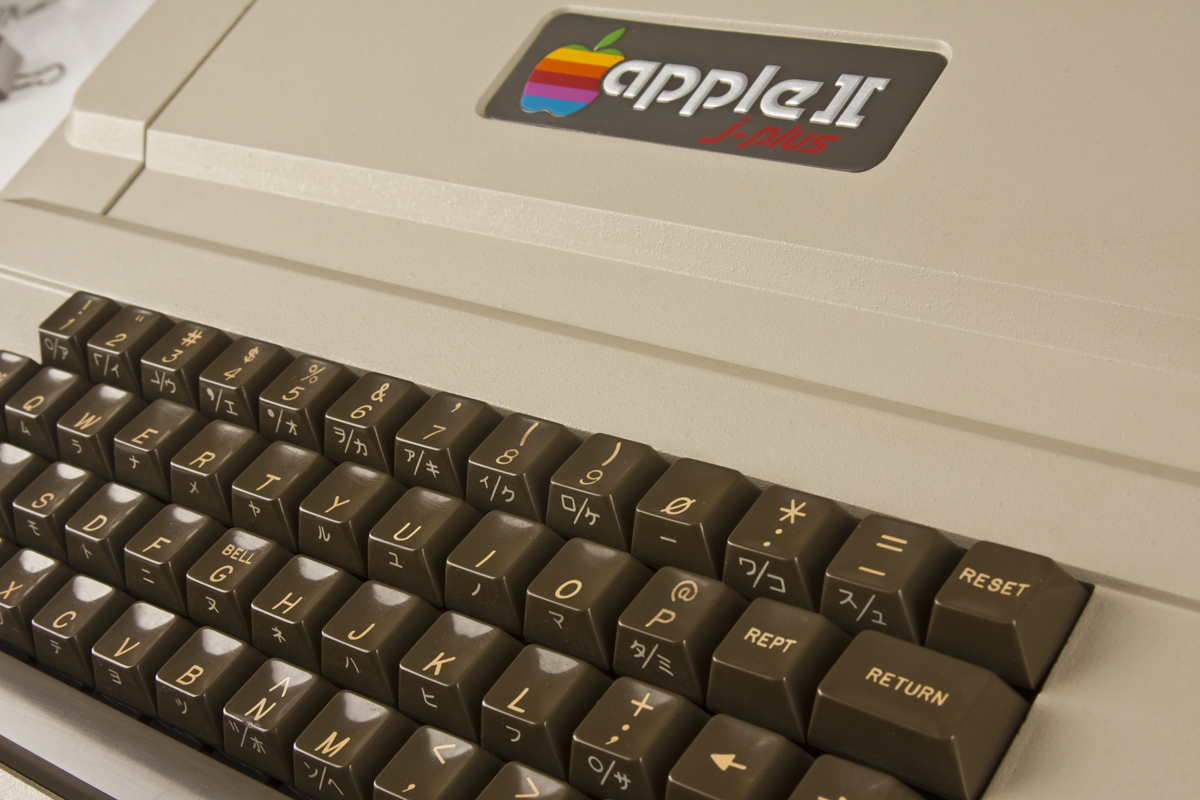
Apple II Europlus (left) and J‑Plus (right)

After the success of the Apple II in the United States, Apple expanded into European and Japanese markets with the Apple II Europlus and Apple II J-Plus, respectively. These models incorporated hardware, software, and firmware changes to accommodate local electrical standards and languages. Both were otherwise largely similar to the Apple II Plus, and most software remained compatible.

The Europlus was adapted for European electrical standards and used the PAL television standard instead of the original Apple II's NTSC system. Because the technique used to generate color NTSC graphics (composite artifact colors) did not work with PAL, the built-in video output was monochrome. Color PAL graphics required an additional video card installed in slot 7. Regional versions also incorporated changes to the character-generation and monitor ROMs to support accented characters and diacritical marks.

Released in July 1980, the J-Plus was adapted for Japanese electrical standards and included a modified character ROM and keyboard layout to support Katakana writing. It did not support full Kanji character sets. In other countries, localized versions generally retained the American keyboard layout. For example, the German version used a QWERTY layout rather than the standard German QWERTZ layout and lacked umlauts.

=== ITT 2020 ===
The ITT 2020 was an Apple II clone manufactured by ITT under license from Apple Computer (the first licensed clone), specifically for the European market. In contrast to the Apple II Europlus, the ITT 2020 supported full PAL color graphics

=== Bell & Howell ===
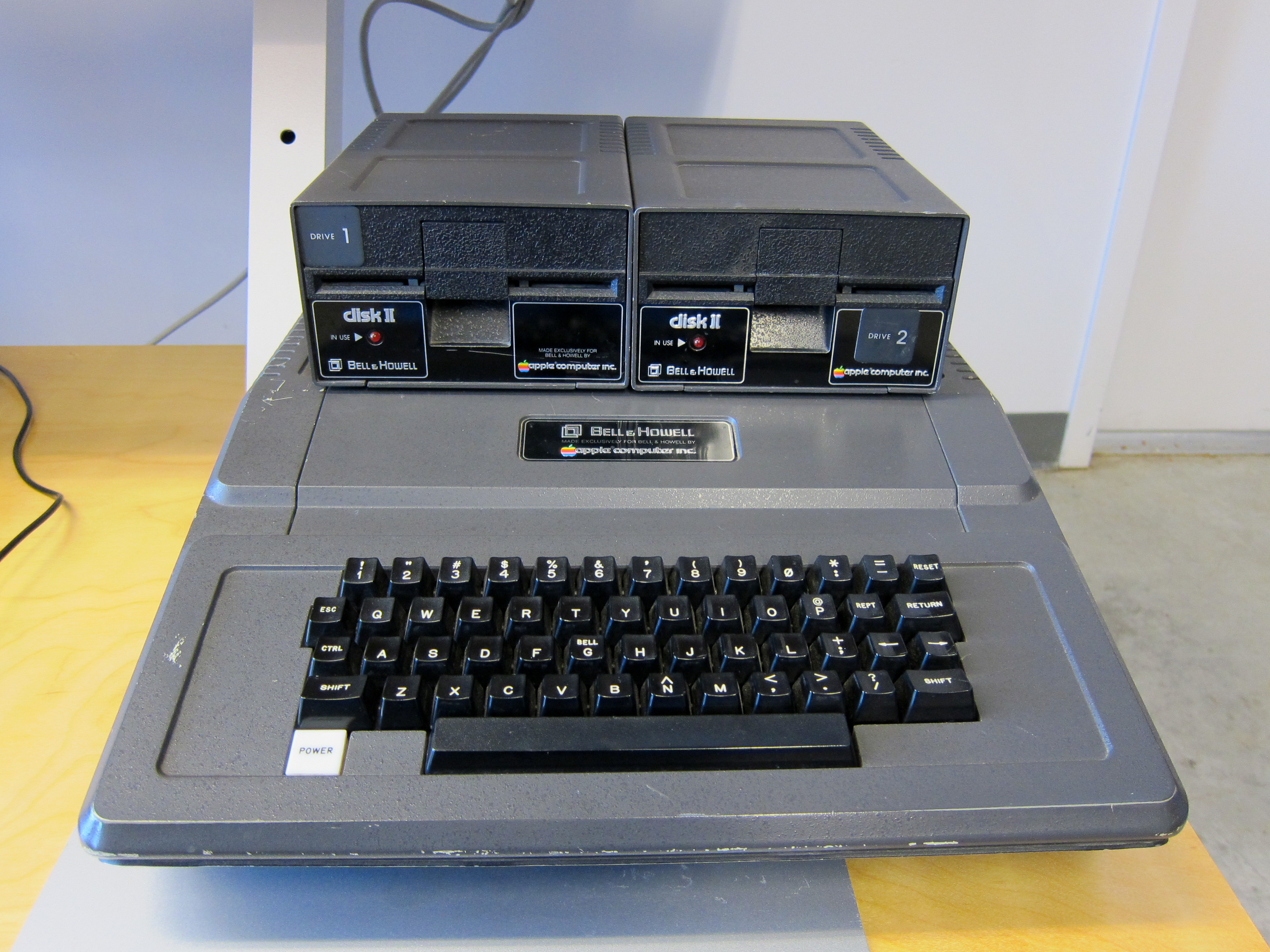
Bell & Howell Apple II Plus

The Apple II Plus was also sold by Bell & Howell specifically to educational markets under special license from Apple. The standard Apple II Plus was not UL-listed because the top could be opened; the B&H model was the same as the consumer version sold by Apple except that it came in a black case, which could not be opened as easily, and a special A/V package allowing it to be sold as audio/visual equipment. Bell & Howell packaged the unit with optional "back packs" that offered various inputs and outputs for A/V equipment to easily interface with the II Plus. This was the only black computer Apple would manufacture until the Macintosh TV in 1993.

=== Military applications ===
A TEMPEST-approved version of the Apple II Plus was created in 1980 by the Georgia Tech Research Institute for U.S. Army FORSCOM, and used as a component in the earliest versions of the Microfix system. Fielded in 1982, the Microfix system was the first tactical system using video disc (LaserDisc) map technology providing zoom and scroll over map imagery coupled with a point database of intelligence data such as order of battle, airfields, roadways, and bridges.

Timeline of Apple II family
See also: Timeline of the Apple II series, Timeline of Macintosh models, and Timeline of Apple Inc. products

== See also ==
- List of Apple II games
- List of publications and periodicals devoted to the Apple II
- Apple II peripheral cards
