= Xedex =

Xedex Corporation

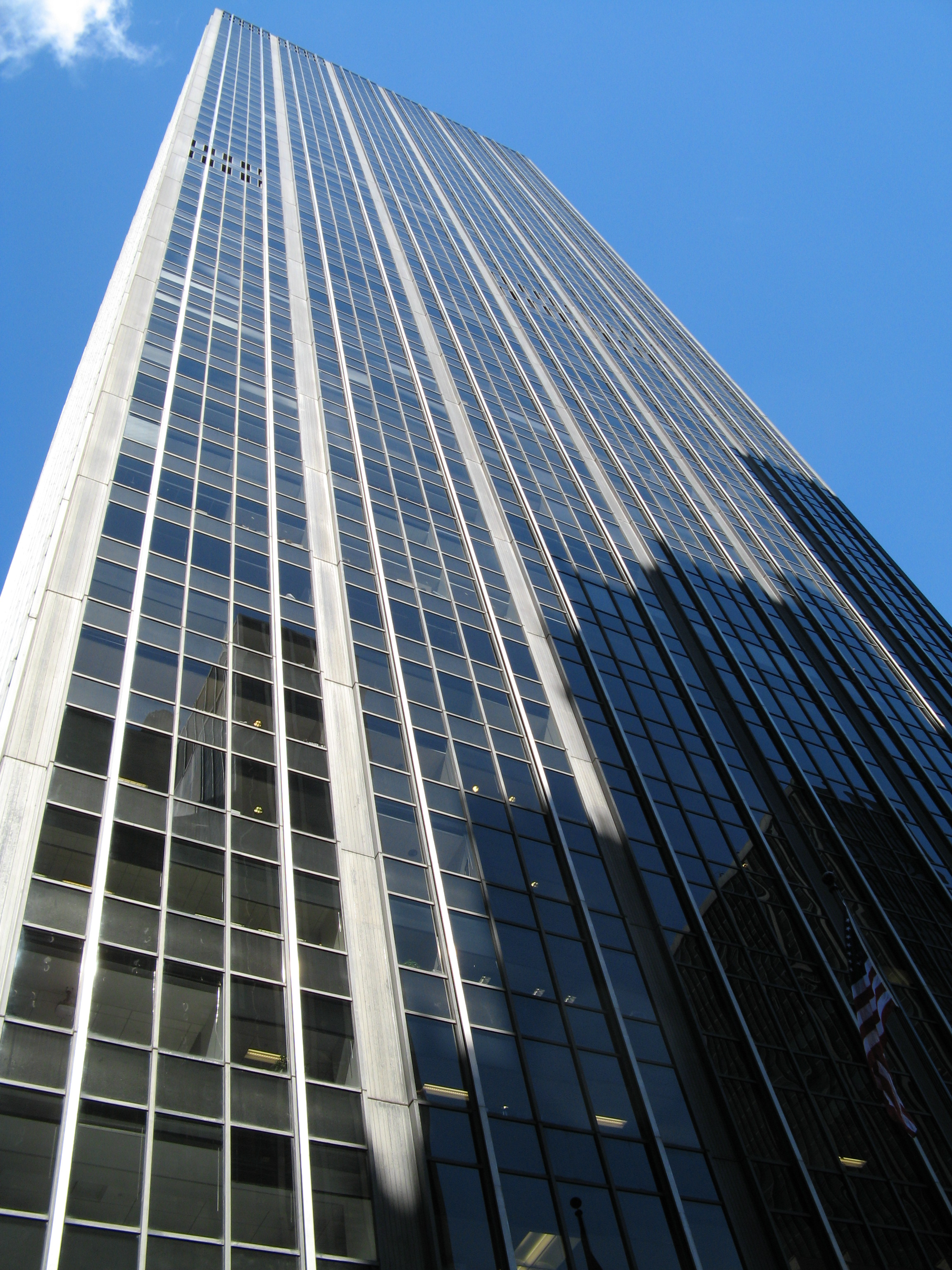
- Burlington House, site of former headquarters in New York
- Type: Private
- Industry: Computer
- Founded: January 1982; 44 years ago in New York, New York, United States
- Founder: Harris Landgarten
- Defunct: September 24, 1982; 44 years ago
- Fate: Acquired by TU International in 1982; dissolved in 1984

Xedex Corporation was an American computer company based in New York active from 1982 to 1984. It was best known for the Baby Blue, a Z80 SoftCard for the IBM Personal Computer that allowed the PC to run software titles developed for CP/M-80, which numbered in the tens of thousands at the time. Xedex developed a number of other hardware and software products before being absorbed into its sister company and manufacturing arm Microlog, Inc., in 1984.

== History ==
Xedex Corporation was founded by Harris Landgarten in New York City in January 1982. Landgarten had previously worked as a consultant for Lifeboat Associates, a large microcomputer software developer and publisher based in New York. The genesis for Xedex's foundation came in late 1981 when Landgarten's co-worker Mike Aronson came into Lifeboat bearing a prototype for a Z80 SoftCard for the IBM Personal Computer, designed to let the PC run the tens of thousands of existing software titles developed for CP/M-80. Aronson developed the board from his home-run company Aox Inc. in Waltham, Massachusetts. Despite Lifeboat itself being a major vendor of CP/M software and the card having the potential to open up the company to the large installed based of IBM PC users, Lifeboat expressed no interest in commercializing the card. Seeing an untapped niche, Landgarten bought the rights to Aronson's prototype from Aox and founded Xedex the following January with $2.5 million in funding from Rockie Smith, an entrepreneur from Oklahoma whose primary trade was in energy services. Landgarten poached several employees from Lifeboat, including Alan Bowker, whom he named vice president of West Coast operations; Roland Joffe, whom he named vice president of sales and marketing; and Stephen Walton, whom he named head of technical writing.

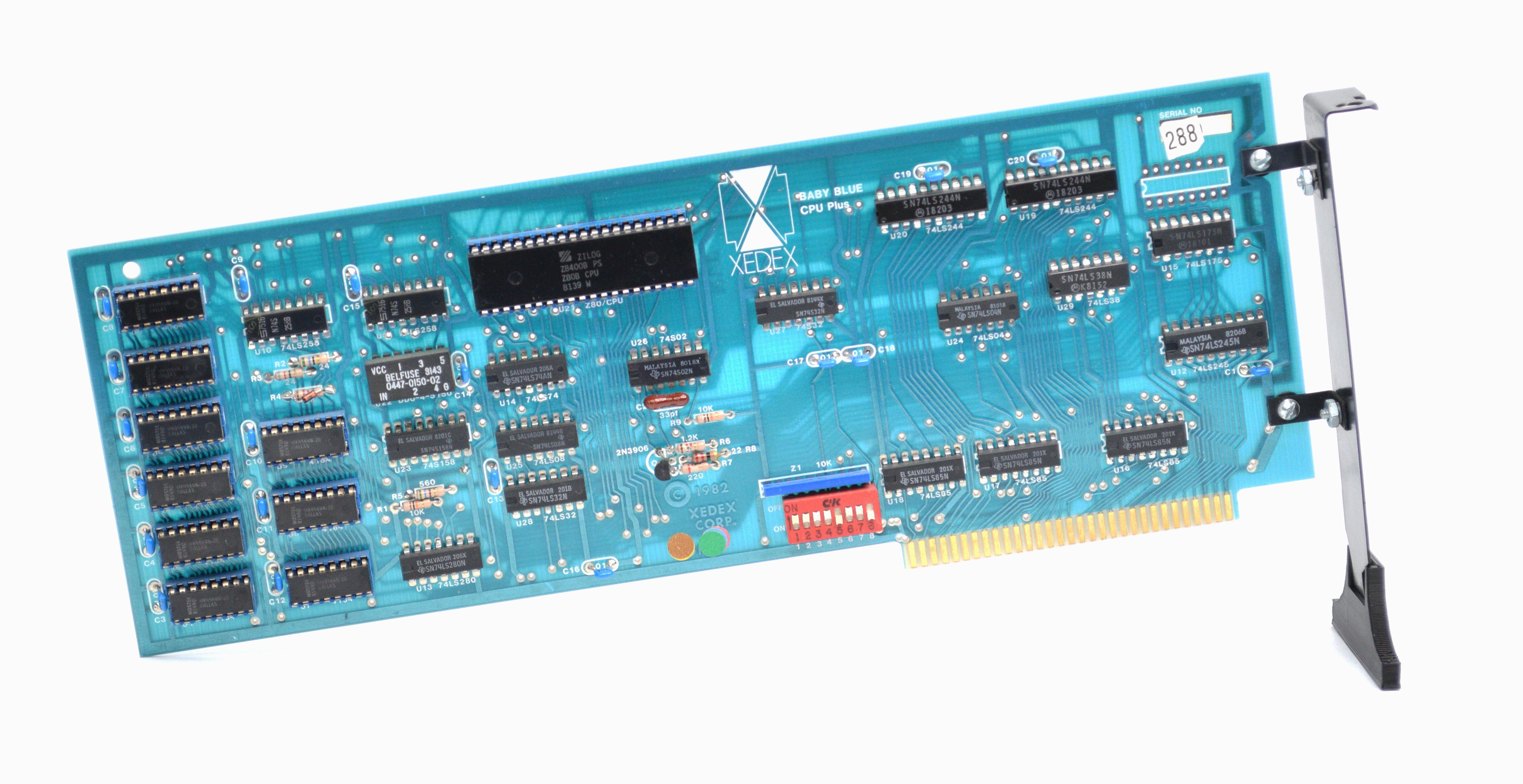
An original Baby Blue expansion card from 1982

Xedex realized Aronson's prototype as the Baby Blue and released it in February 1982. An ISA expansion card, it has a Zilog Z80B processor and 64 KB of RAM on-board. The card is capable of running its Z80 processor simultaneously with the IBM PC's native Intel 8088; when not providing CP/M capability, the card's RAM is available to the PC. Baby Blue uses its own disk format; as with other CP/M computers, software and data must use that format, or be converted from another. Besides providing a conversion tool, Xedex bundled several of its own in-house CP/M-80 software titles with the Baby Blue, including The Boss, a financial accounting program, and Friday, a daily executive planner.

Tony Gold, president of Lifeboat Associates and Landgarten's former employer, responded to the Baby Blue with confusion: "It's kind of a step backwards. I find it strange that somebody would want to buy an IBM Personal Computer and then downgrade it to an 8-bit machine." The Baby Blue nonetheless proved popular, with Xedex booking $1 million in orders and scoring multiple lucrative deals with resellers including ComputerLand, who stocked the Baby Blue at their brick-and-mortar stores.

The working environment at Xedex began to unravel as Smith took umbrage with Landgarten and Joffe's expenditures for the company. By his estimate, the company went through $1.5 million of the initial $2.5 million startup capital in five months, with $40,000 of the company's $300,000 monthly spending solely going toward rent at the company's Avenue of the Americas suite at Burlington House. In July 1982, Smith ousted Landgerten and Joffe and relocated Xedex to Suffern in downstate New York, closer to Xedex's sister company Microlog, which was responsible for the manufacturing of Xedex's products. Immediately afterward, Landgerten began mounting a buyout of Smith's interest in the company, although he was ultimately unsuccessful. Xedex's spending was reduced to $90,000 per month, while the company began research and development of new, more diverse hardware products. Smith replaced Landgarten as president of Xedex with Robert Watson.

On September 24, 1982, Xedex and Microlog were acquired by Smith's shell company, Duke of Energy Corporation, based in Cushing, Oklahoma. Duke of Energy later renamed itself to TU International in 1983 after acquiring Terminals Unlimited, Inc., a terminal manufacturer based in Falls Church, Virginia. In October 1982, the company announced its second hardware product, Baby Talk, an expansion card for the IBM PC that allowed it to emulate a IBM 3270 terminal for communicating with IBM mainframes. In early 1983, Xedex released the Little Red Ram, a 256-KB RAM expansion card that was bundled with P.D.Q., a RAM disk configuration utility developed in-house. In February 1983, Xedex released Baby Tex, a Z80 coprocessor card for Texas Instruments' TI Professional Computer.

By 1984, TU International had consolidated Xedex into Microlog, with the latter taking over sales and marketing of Xedex's former products. In late March 1984, the company announced the successor to the Baby Blue, the Baby Blue II, which on-board serial and parallel ports and a greater amount of stock on-board RAM.

TU International filed for Chapter 11 bankruptcy in September 1985.

== Reception ==
Larry Magid assessed the Baby Blue positively in PC Magazine's first issue, albeit with the qualification that the product would soon become obsolete given the IBM PC's rapidly growing software library, with any specialized software title exclusive to CP/M soon to be replaced by an equivalent PC title. He noted that the card was only $40 more than IBM's 64 KB expansion board. Frank J. Derfler of InfoWorld noted that Baby Blue's documentation agreed with Magid on its eventual obsolescence. He gave high marks to the card's documentation, ease of use and set-up, and performance.
