= Apple II processor cards =

Apple II processor cards (or co-processor cards) were special cards that could be used to allow the Apple II to use different processors on the (otherwise) same computer hardware. This allowed other operating systems to run on the Apple II.

Here are some processors that were available on coprocessor cards for the Apple II:

- Zilog Z80 – Microsoft SoftCard or compatibles, ran CP/M
- Intel 8088 – the AD8088 Processor Card, from ALF Products, ran CP/M-86 and MS-DOS as well as increased the speed of math functions in Applesoft BASIC. MetaCard, from Metamorphic Systems (a 1982 startup by Phil Zimmermann), ran CP/M-86, MS-DOS, and UCSD Pascal
- Motorola 6809 – The Mill, by Stellation Two, ran OS-9 Level One. AP10 by IBS running FLEX
- Motorola 68008 – mc magazine
- DEC LSI-11 – (unconfirmed)

== See also ==
- Apple II peripheral cards
