= Apple IIe =

Third model in the Apple II series of personal computers

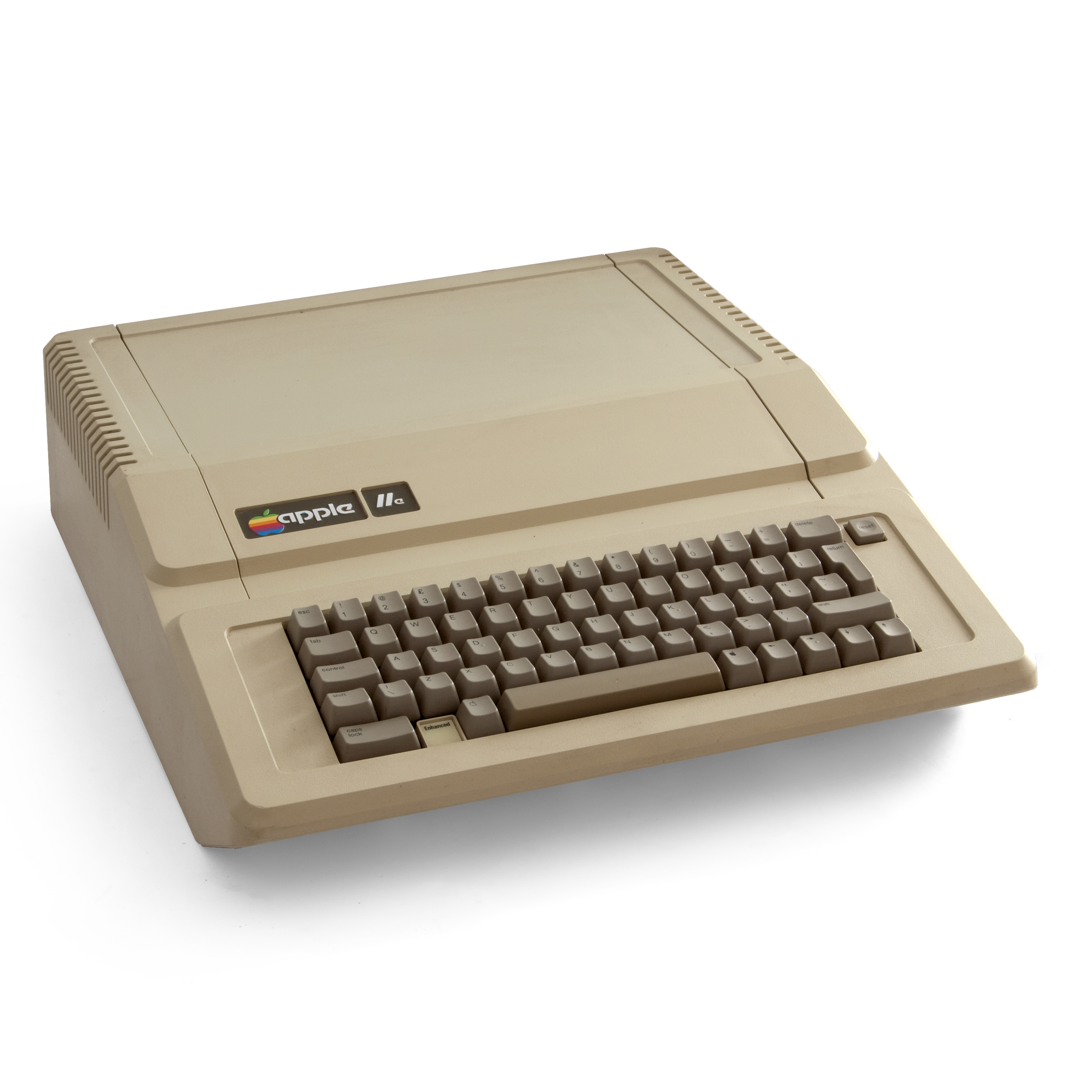
- 1984 case with British keyboard layout and Enhanced IIe upgrade sticker on power light
- Manufacturer: Apple Computer
- Product family: Apple II
- Type: Desktop
- Released: January 1983; 43 years ago
- Introductory price: US$1,395 (equivalent to $4,509 in 2025)
- Discontinued: November 15, 1993; 32 years ago
- Operating system: Apple DOS 3.3; ProDOS; Apple Pascal
- CPU: IIe: 6502 @ 1.023 MHz; Enhanced & Platinum: 65C02 @ 1.023 MHz
- Memory: 64 KB of RAM (up to 1 MB)
- Predecessor: Apple II Plus
- Related: Apple IIc

The Apple IIe (sometimes styled as Apple //e) is the third model in the Apple II series of personal computers produced by Apple Computer. Released in January 1983 as the successor to the Apple II Plus. The e in its name stands for enhanced as it introduced several features as standard, including lowercase text support, 80-column text support, and 64 KB of RAM. The IIe also used approximately 75% fewer chips than earlier models, reducing manufacturing costs.

The Apple IIe remained in production from January 1983 to November 1993. Although its design changed relatively little during that period, Apple introduced a motherboard revision, a major firmware update, and two cosmetically revised versions. Having been manufactured and sold for nearly 11 years, the IIe was the longest-lived computer in Apple's history as of 2026.

== History ==
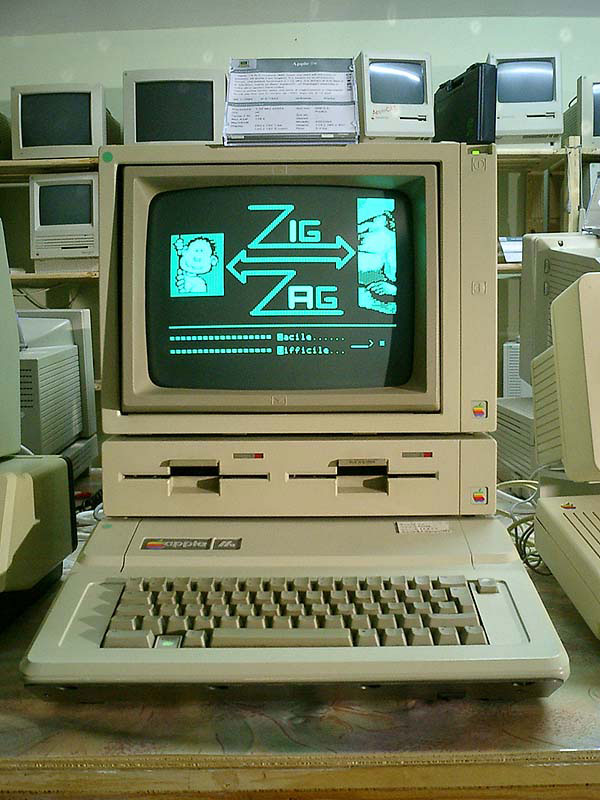
Apple IIe with DuoDisk and Monitor II

Apple Computer planned to discontinue the Apple II series after the introduction of the Apple III in 1980; the company intended to clearly establish market segmentation by designing the Apple III to appeal to the business market, leaving the Apple II for home and education users. Management believed that "once the Apple III was out, the Apple II would stop selling in six months", cofounder Steve Wozniak later said.

By the time IBM released the rival IBM PC in 1981, the Apple II's technology was already four years old. In September 1981 InfoWorld reported—below the PC's announcement—that Apple was secretly developing three new computers "to be ready for release within a year": Lisa, Macintosh, and "Diana". Describing the last as a software-compatible Apple II replacement—"A 6502 machine using custom LSI" and a simpler motherboard—it said that Diana "was ready for release months ago" but decided to improve the design to better compete with the Xerox 820. "Now it appears that when Diana is ready for release, it will offer features and a price that will make the Apple II uncompetitive", the magazine wrote.

"Apple's plans to phase out the Apple II have also been delayed by complications in the design of the Apple III", the article also said. BYTE reported in October 1982 a rumor that the next Apple II would be called the IIe. After the Apple III sold poorly, management decided in 1981 that the further continuation of the Apple II was in the company's best interest. After 3 1/2 years of the Apple II Plus, essentially at a standstill, came the introduction of a new Apple II model — the Apple IIe (codenamed "Diana" and "Super II"). The Apple IIe was released in January 1983, the successor to the Apple II Plus. The Apple IIe was the first Apple computer with a custom ASIC chip, which reduced much of the old discrete IC-based circuitry to a single chip. This change resulted in reducing the cost and size of the motherboard. Some of the hardware features of the Apple III (e.g. bank-switched memory) were borrowed in the design of the Apple IIe, and some from incorporating the Apple II Plus Language card. The culmination of these changes led to increased sales and greater market share of home, education, and small business use.

The Apple IIe was initially priced at US$1,395 (equivalent to $4,509 in 2025) for just the main unit. A set with the main unit, Disk II and controller, Apple Monitor III and stand, and Extended 80-Column Text Card was initially priced at US$1,995 (equivalent to $6,449 in 2025).

== New features ==
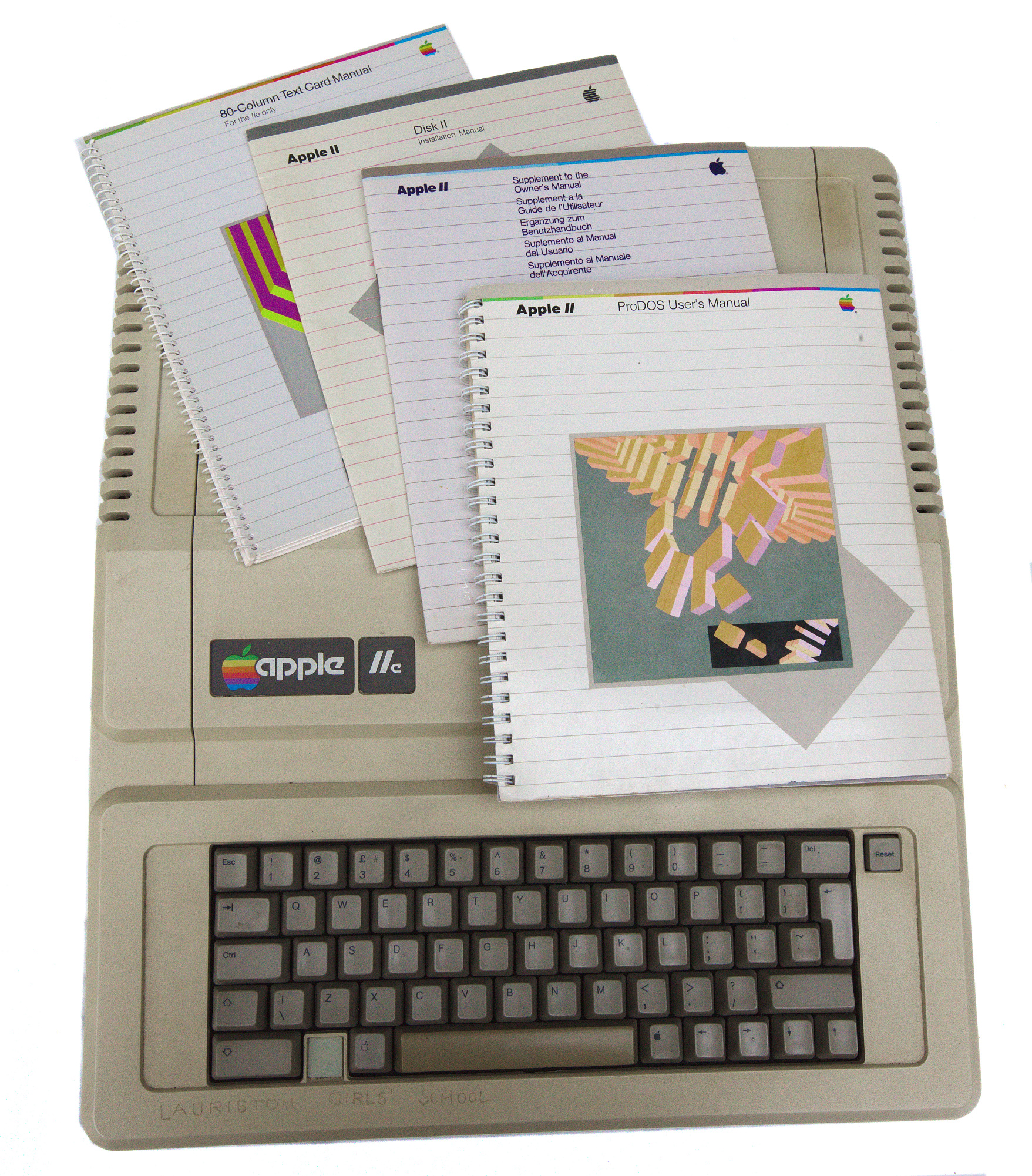
Apple IIe computer chassis with a selection of original documentation

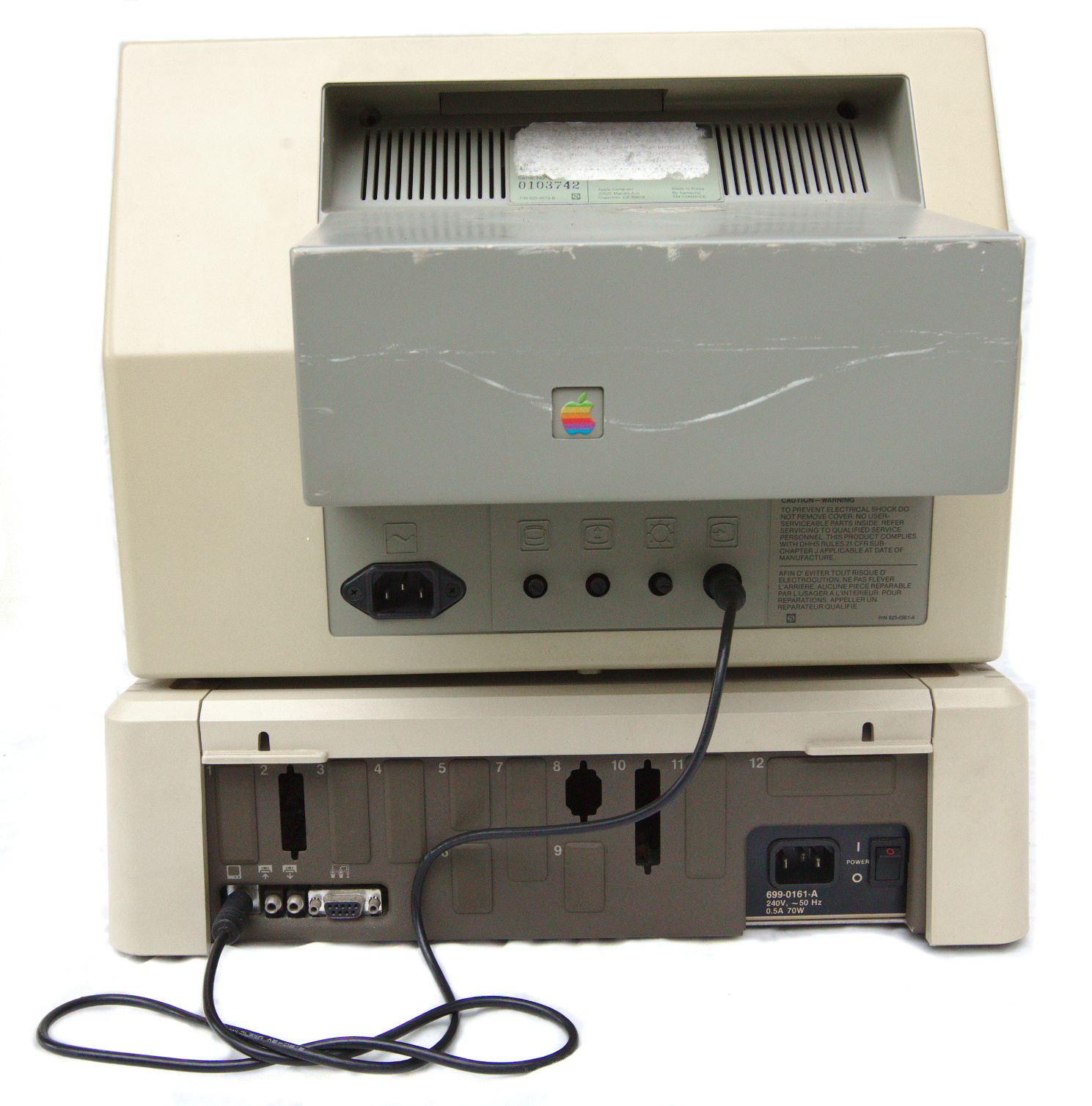
Rear view of an Apple IIe computer and monitor

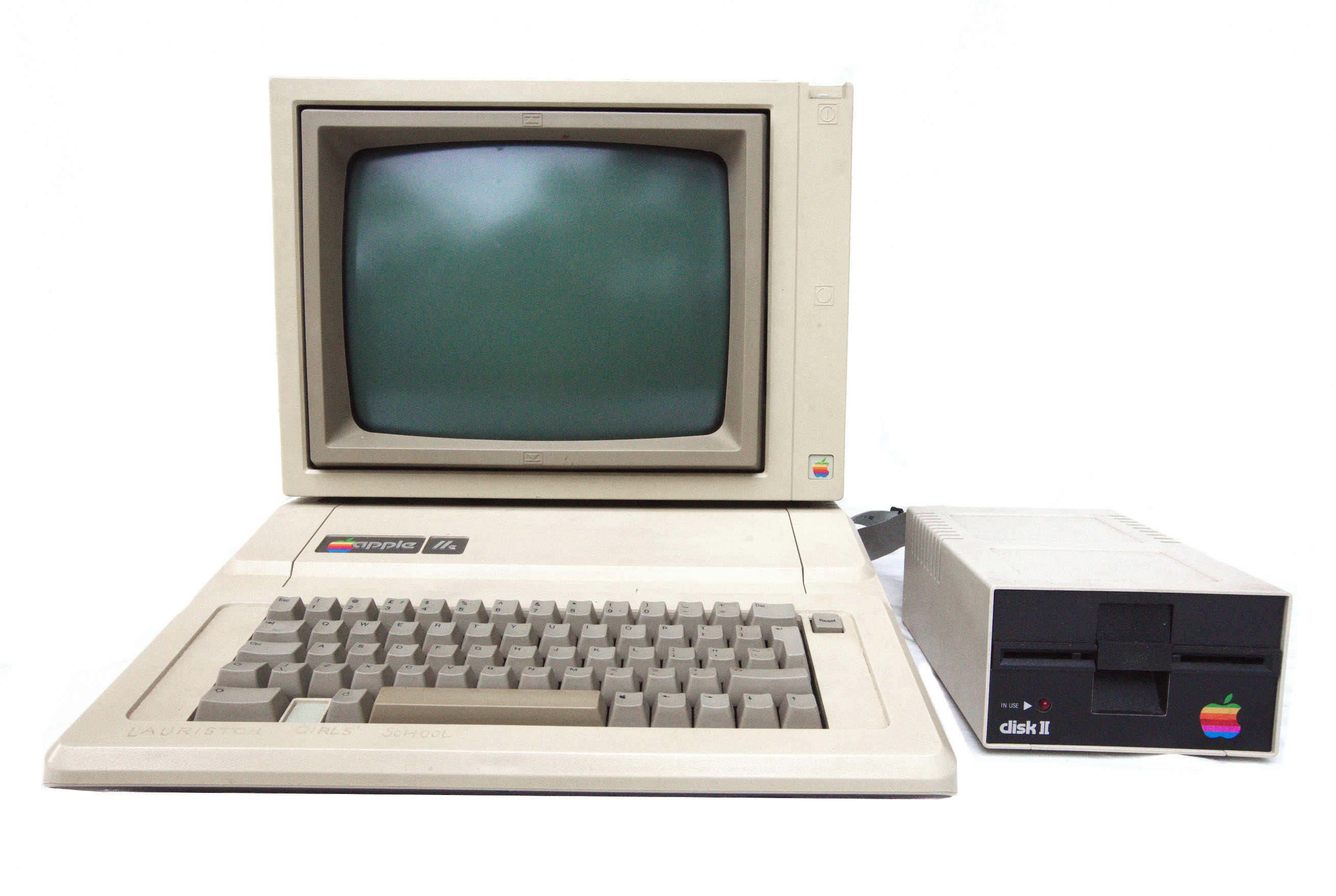
Front view of an Apple IIe system, including computer chassis, monitor, and external 5¼" floppy disk drive

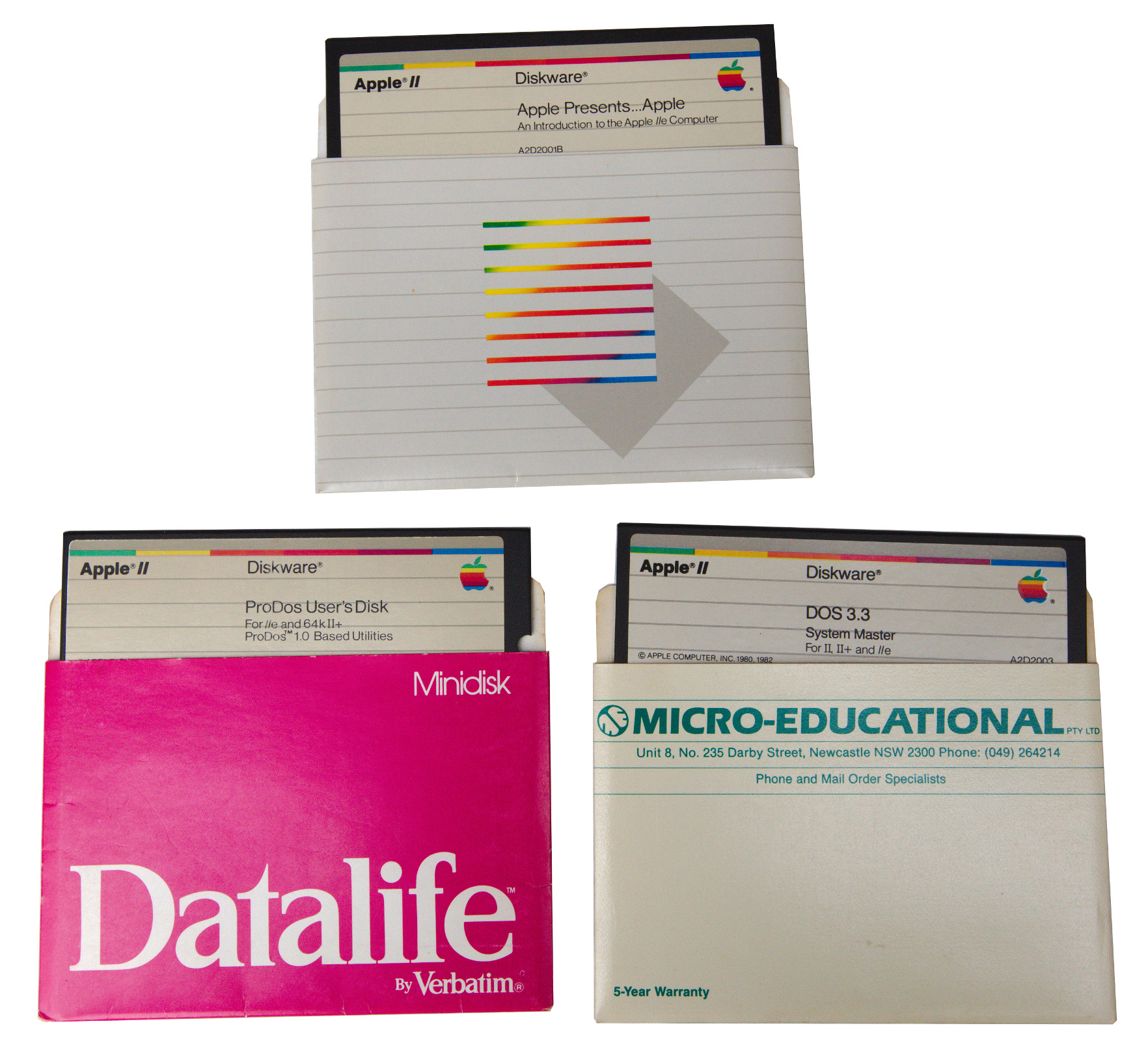
A selection of Apple IIe software

One of the most notable improvements of the Apple IIe is the addition of an ASCII-equivalent printable character set and keyboard. The most important addition is the ability to input and display lower-case letters. Other keyboard improvements include four-way cursor control and standard editing keys (Del and Tab ↹), two special Apple modifier keys (Open and Solid Apple), and a safe off-to-side relocation of the Reset key. The auto-repeat function (any key held down to repeat same character continuously) is now automatic, no longer requiring the REPT key found on the keyboards of previous models.

The machine came standard with 64 KB RAM, with the equivalent of a built-in Apple Language Card in its circuitry, and had a new special "Auxiliary slot" (replacing slot 0, though electronically mapped to slot 3 for compatibility with earlier third-party 80-column cards) for adding more memory via bank-switching RAM cards. Through this slot it also includes built-in support for an 80-column text display on monitors (with the addition of a plug-in 1K memory card, via bank-switching of 40 columns) and could be easily doubled to 128 KB RAM by alternatively plugging in Apple's Extended 80-Column Text Card. As time progressed, even more memory could be added through third-party cards using the same bank-switching slot or, alternatively, general-purpose slot cards that addressed memory 1 byte at a time (i.e. Slinky RAM cards). A new ROM diagnostic routine could be invoked to test the motherboard for faults and also test its main bank of memory.

The Apple IIe lowered production costs and improved reliability by merging the function of several off-the-shelf ICs into single custom chips, reducing total chip count to 31 (compared to 120 chips in the Apple II Plus). The IIe also switched to using newer single-voltage 64x1 DRAM chips instead of the triple-voltage 16x1 DRAM in the II/II+. For this reason the motherboard design is much cleaner and runs cooler as well, with enough room to add a pin-connector for an (optional) external numeric keypad. Also added was a backport-accessible DE-9 joystick connector, making it far easier for users to add and remove game and input devices (previous models requiring plugging the joystick/paddles directly into a 16-pin DIP socket on the motherboard; the IIe retained this connector for backwards compatibility). Also improved were port openings for expansion cards. Rather than cutout V-shaped slot openings as in the Apple II and II Plus, the IIe has a variety of different-sized openings, with thumb-screw holes, to accommodate mounting interface cards with DB-xx and DE-xx connectors (removable plastic covers filled the cutouts if not used).

Although the lower IC count improved reliability over previous Apple II models, Apple still retained the practice of socketing all ICs so that servicing and replacement could be performed more easily. Later-production IIe models had the RAM soldered to the system board rather than socketed.

Despite the hardware changes, the IIe maintained a high degree of backwards compatibility with the previous models, allowing most hardware and software from those systems to be used. Apple provided technical information on the IIe to hundreds of developers before its release, and claimed that, as a result, 85 to 90% of Apple II software worked with it.

== Reception ==
IIe sold well in 1983 despite the IBM PC's great success. Sales rose in late 1983 and early 1984 despite aging technology as the company cut prices, possibly to reduce inventory before announcing IIc. Customers who visited stores curious about Macintosh, or the new IBM PCjr, often bought IIe instead. IIe demand rose after IIc's debut, because of the former's greater expandability.

BYTE wrote in February 1983 that the IIe was "like having an Apple II with all the extras built in ... with a variety of exciting new features and capabilities" for about the same price as the Apple II. It found the computer to be highly compatible with the Apple II and praised the quality of the documentation for developers and beginners. The review concluded, "Congratulations, Apple Computer, you've produced another winner". InfoWorld's reviewers, Apple II Plus owners for four years, wished that the IIe's price were lower but stated that it "does give you more for your money, however". They also found compatibility to be very high, and concluded that "we are generally pleased with the changes Apple has provided with the IIe". Creative Computing said in December 1984 that the IIe and IIc were the best home computers with prices above $500, with the IIe better for those wanting expansion cards, color graphics, and educational and entertainment software. The magazine also chose the IIe as the best educational computer above $1000, citing Apple's strong early commitment to the market and large number of third-party education-related peripherals.

== Specifications ==
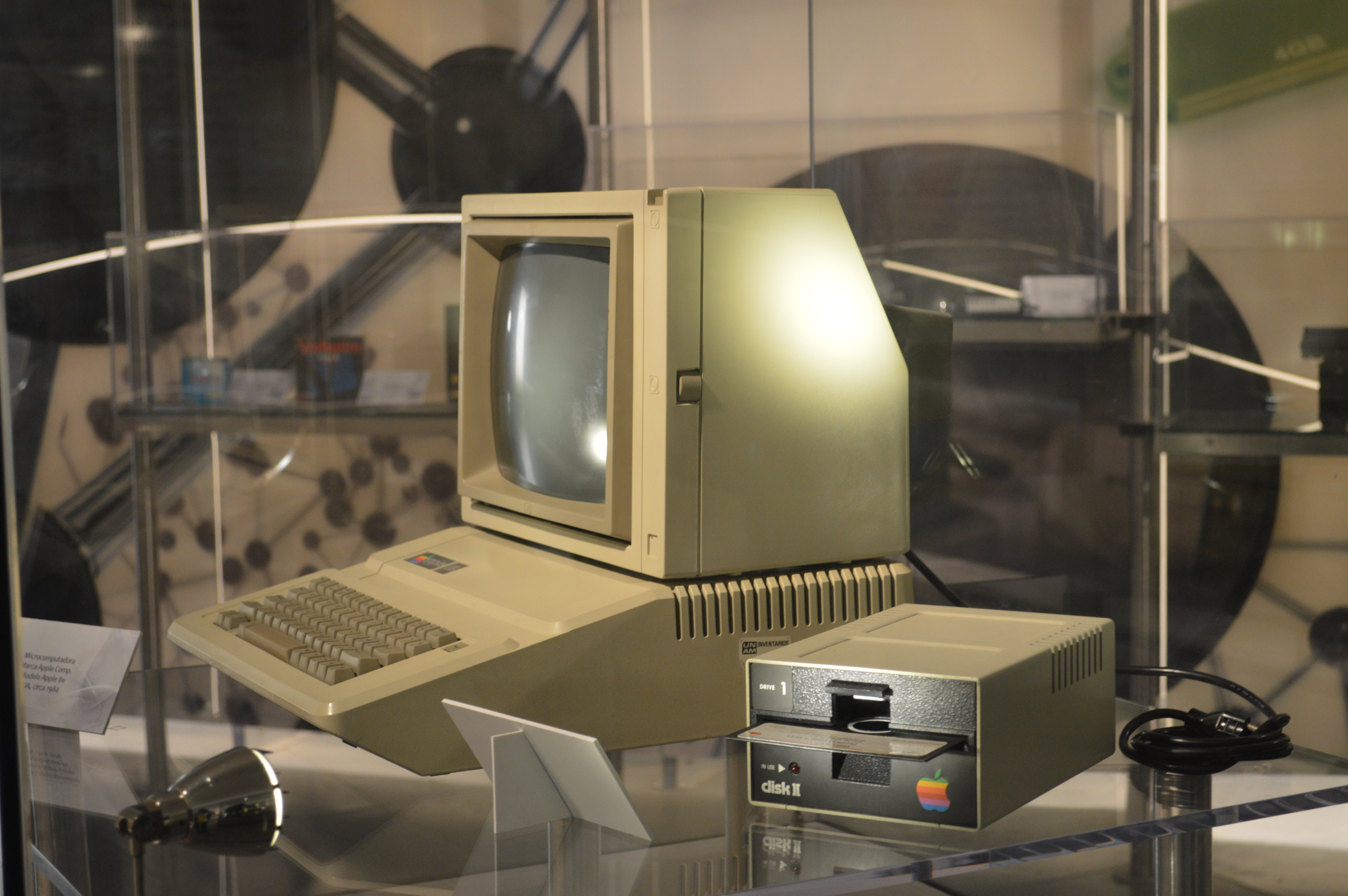
Apple IIe with external Disk II floppy drive at the Universum museum in Mexico City

- Microprocessor
  - 6502A or 65C02 running at 1.023 MHz
  - 8-bit data bus
- Memory
  - 64 KB RAM built-in
  - 16 KB ROM built-in
  - Expandable from 64 KB up to 1 MB RAM or more
- Video modes
  - 40 and 80 columns text, white-on-black, with 24 lines (Note: Text can be mixed with graphic modes, replacing either bottom 8 or 32 lines of graphics with four lines of text, depending on video mode)
  - Low-Resolution: 40×48 (16 colors) (Note: Effectively 15 colors via composite output, two grays have near-identical brightness (RGB output unaffected))
  - High-Resolution: 280×192 (6 colors) (Note: Effectively 140×192 in color, due to pixel placement restrictions)
  - Double-Low-Resolution: 80×48 (16 colors)
  - Double-High-Resolution: 560×192 (16 colors)
- Audio
  - Built-in speaker; 1-bit toggling
  - Built-in cassette recorder interface; 1-bit toggle output, 1-bit zero-crossing input
- Expansion
  - Seven Apple II Bus slots (50-pin card-edge)
  - Auxiliary slot (60-pin card-edge)
- Internal connectors
  - Game I/O socket (16-pin DIP)
  - RF modulation output (4-pin Molex)
  - Numeric keypad (11-pin Molex)
- External connectors
  - NTSC composite video output (RCA connector)
  - Cassette in/out (two 1/8-inch mono phono jacks)
  - Joystick (DE-9)

== Revisions ==
In production from January 1983 to November 1993, the Apple IIe remained relatively unchanged through the years. However, there was one significant motherboard update, a major firmware update and two cosmetically revised machines. These revisions are detailed below.

=== Revision A motherboard ===
At the time of the Apple IIe's introduction, and well into the first few months of production, this motherboard shipped with all units. Graphics modes supported are identical to, and limited to, those of the Apple II Plus before it (Double-Low/Double-High resolution is not supported). This revision logic board is also incompatible with a small number of newer plug-in expansion slot cards. Under a free service upgrade program, Apple advised owners of the revision A to have authorized dealers replace it with the revision B motherboard.

=== Revision B motherboard ===
Shortly after the "Revision A" motherboard's release in 1983, engineers discovered that the bank-switching feature (which used a paralleled 64 KB of RAM on the Extended 80-Column Card or 1 KB to produce 80 columns using bank-switching) could also be used to produce a new graphics mode, Double-High-Resolution, which doubles the horizontal resolution and increases the number of colors from the 6 of standard High-Resolution to 16. In order to support this, some modifications had to be made to the motherboard, which became the Revision B. In addition to supporting Double-High-Resolution and a rarely used Double-Low-Resolution mode (see specifications above) it also added a special video signal accessible in slot 7.

Apple upgraded the motherboard free of charge. In later years Apple labeled newer IIe motherboards with a "-A" suffix once again, although in terms of functionality they were Revision B motherboards.

=== New case and keyboard ===
In 1984, Apple revised the case and keyboard. The original IIe uses a case very similar to the Apple II Plus, painted and with Velcro-type clips to secure the lid with a strip of metal mesh along the edge to eliminate radio frequency interference. The new case is made of dyed plastic mold in a slightly darker beige with a simplified snap-case lid. The other noticeable change is a new keyboard, with more-professional-looking print on darker keycaps (small black lettering, versus large white print). This was the first cosmetic change.

=== Enhanced IIe ===
After the post-IIc rise in IIe sales, Apple reportedly decided in mid-1984 to reposition the latter as an expandable IIc. In March 1985, the company released a new revision called the Enhanced IIe. It is completely identical to the previous machine except for four chips changed on the motherboard (and a small "Enhanced" or "65C02" sticker placed over the keyboard power indicator). The purpose of the update was to make the Apple IIe more compatible with the Apple IIc (released the previous year) and, to a smaller degree, the Apple II Plus. This change involved a new processor, the CMOS-based 65C02 CPU, a new character ROM for the text modes, and two new ROM firmware chips. The 65C02 added more CPU instructions, the new character ROM added 32 special "MouseText" characters (which allowed the creation of a GUI-like display in text mode, similar to IBM code page 437), and the new ROM firmware fixed problems and speed issues with 80-column text, introduced the ability to use lowercase in Applesoft BASIC and Monitor, and contained some other smaller improvements (and fixes) in the latter two (including the return of the Mini-Assembler—which had vanished with the introduction of the II Plus firmware).

Although it affected compatibility with a small number of software titles (particularly those that did not follow Apple programming guidelines and rules, used illegal opcodes that were no longer available in the new CMOS-based CPU, or used the alternate 80-column character set that MouseText now occupied) a fair bit of newer software — mostly productivity applications and utilities — required the Enhanced chipset to run at all. An official upgrade kit, consisting of the four replacement chips and an "Enhanced" sticker badge, was made available for purchase to owners of the original Apple IIe. An alternative at the time, which some users chose as a cost-cutting measure, was to simply purchase their own 65C02 CPU and create (unlicensed and illegal) duplicates of the updated ROMs using re-rewritable EPROM chips. When Apple phased out the Enhancement kit in the early 1990s, this became the only available method for users looking to upgrade their IIe, and remains so right up until the present day. An Enhanced machine identifies itself with the name "Apple //e" on its start-up splash screen (as opposed to the less-specific "Apple ] [").

=== Platinum IIe ===
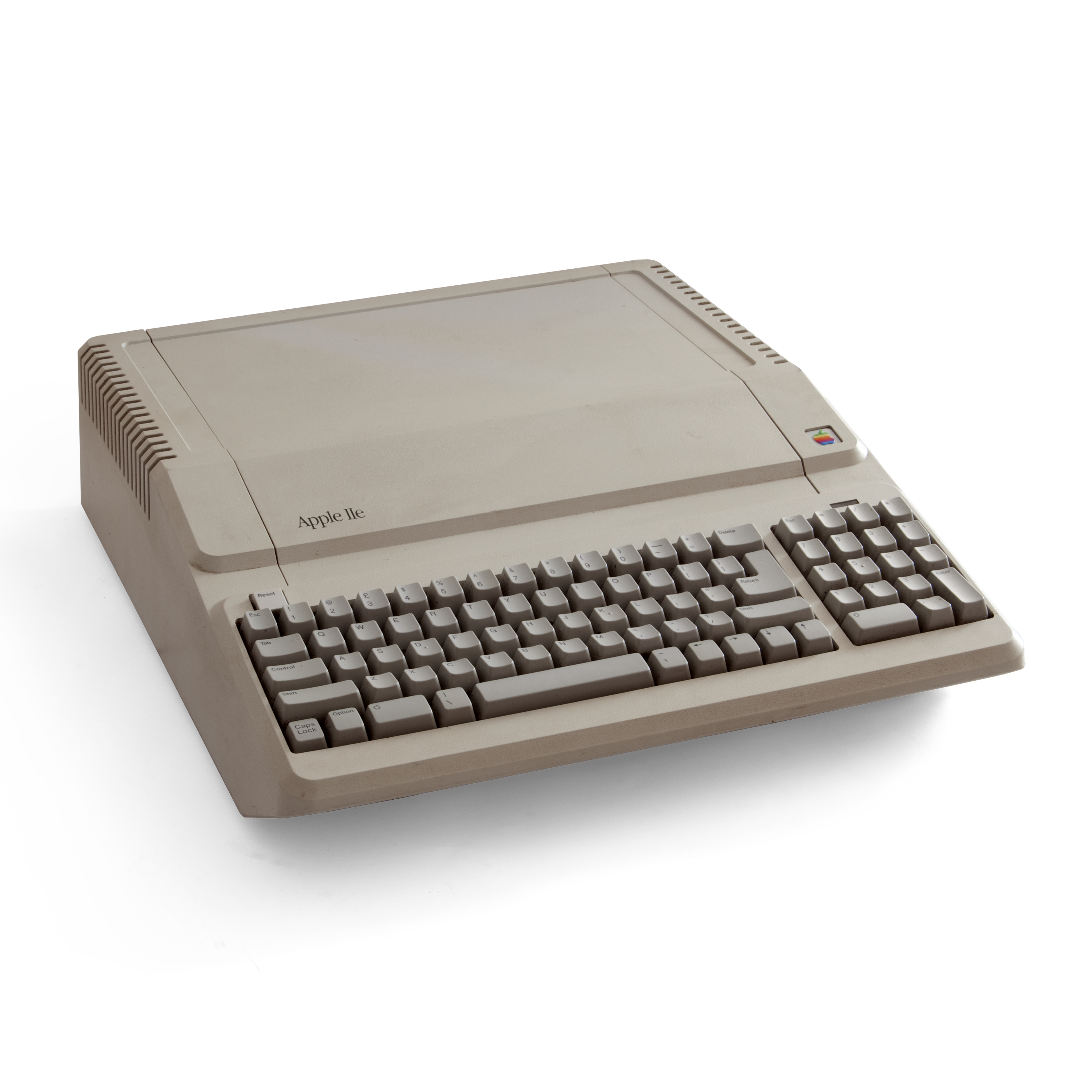
The "Platinum" Apple IIe with numeric keypad

The final revision of the Apple IIe was introduced in January 1987. It was nicknamed the Platinum IIe because its light gray case used Apple's "Platinum" color scheme. Apple referred to it as the "extended keyboard Apple IIe" because it included a built-in numeric keypad. The keyboard layout was revised to match that of the Apple IIGS: the Reset key was moved above the Esc and 1 keys, the "Solid Apple" key was repositioned and relabeled "Option", and the power indicator was moved above the numeric keypad.

Most changes were cosmetic. The recessed metal identification badges were replaced with an "Apple IIe" label silk-screened onto the case lid in Apple's Garamond typeface. A smaller Apple logo badge remained on the right side of the case.

The computer included a factory-installed Extended 80-Column Text Card in the auxiliary slot, bringing the standard memory configuration to 128 KB and enabling Double-Hi-Res graphics. The motherboard also used fewer chips than earlier revisions: one 128K ROM chip replaced the two monitor ROM chips, and two 64K × 4 RAM chips replaced the eight 64K × 1 chips used for the onboard 64 KB of RAM. The single-wire Shift-key modification, which allowed software to detect presses of the Shift keys, was also standard. The Platinum IIe had no firmware changes.

Capacitors were added to the game I/O socket to reduce radio-frequency interference when a joystick was connected. However, the filtering reduced the socket's available bandwidth, interfering with some specialized devices used for temperature measurement, robotic control, and data transfer between computers. These devices might not work unless the capacitors were removed.

It was not sold in Europe and was discontinued on November 15, 1993. It was the longest-running version of the IIe, and its discontinuation brought production of the Apple II family to an end.

== Apple IIe Card for Macintosh ==
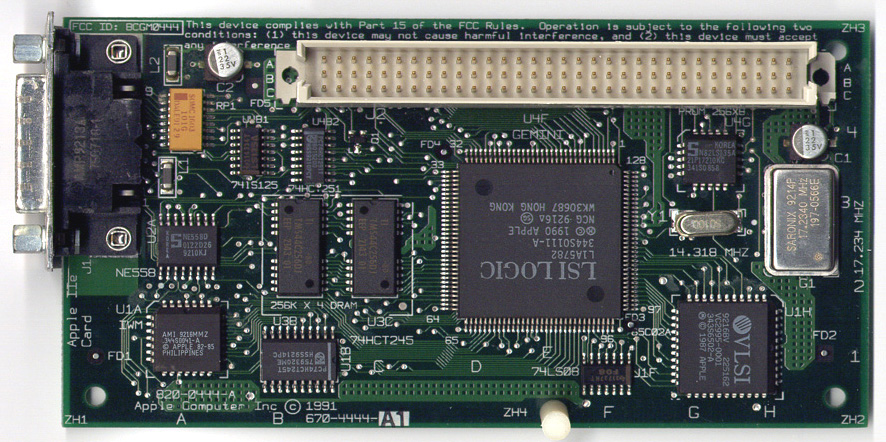
Apple IIe Card

In March 1991, shortly after the release of the Macintosh LC series, Apple released the Apple IIe Card for the Macintosh. By plugging this card into a Macintosh LC (and later models incorporating a similar PDS slot), through hardware and some software emulation, most software written for the Apple IIe computer can run on the system. This miniaturized computer on a card was made possible by a chip called the Gemini, which is heavily based on the Mega II, first used in the Apple IIGS computer to emulate the Apple IIe. The Gemini duplicates most of the functions of a standard Apple IIe, except the RAM, ROM, video generation and CPU.

Many of the built-in Macintosh peripherals can be "borrowed" by the card when in Apple II mode (i.e. extra RAM, 3 1/2-inch floppy, AppleTalk networking, real-time clock, hard disk). It can run at either standard 1.023 MHz speed or an accelerated 2.046 MHz. As video is emulated using Macintosh QuickDraw routines, it is sometimes unable to keep up with the speed of a real Apple IIe, especially in the case of slower host machines. With a specialized Y-cable, the card can use an actual Apple 5.25, Apple UniDisk 3.5 and Apple II joystick or paddles. The Apple IIe Card is thought of as an Apple II compatibility solution or emulator rather than as an extension of the Apple II line.

== International versions ==
=== Regional differences ===
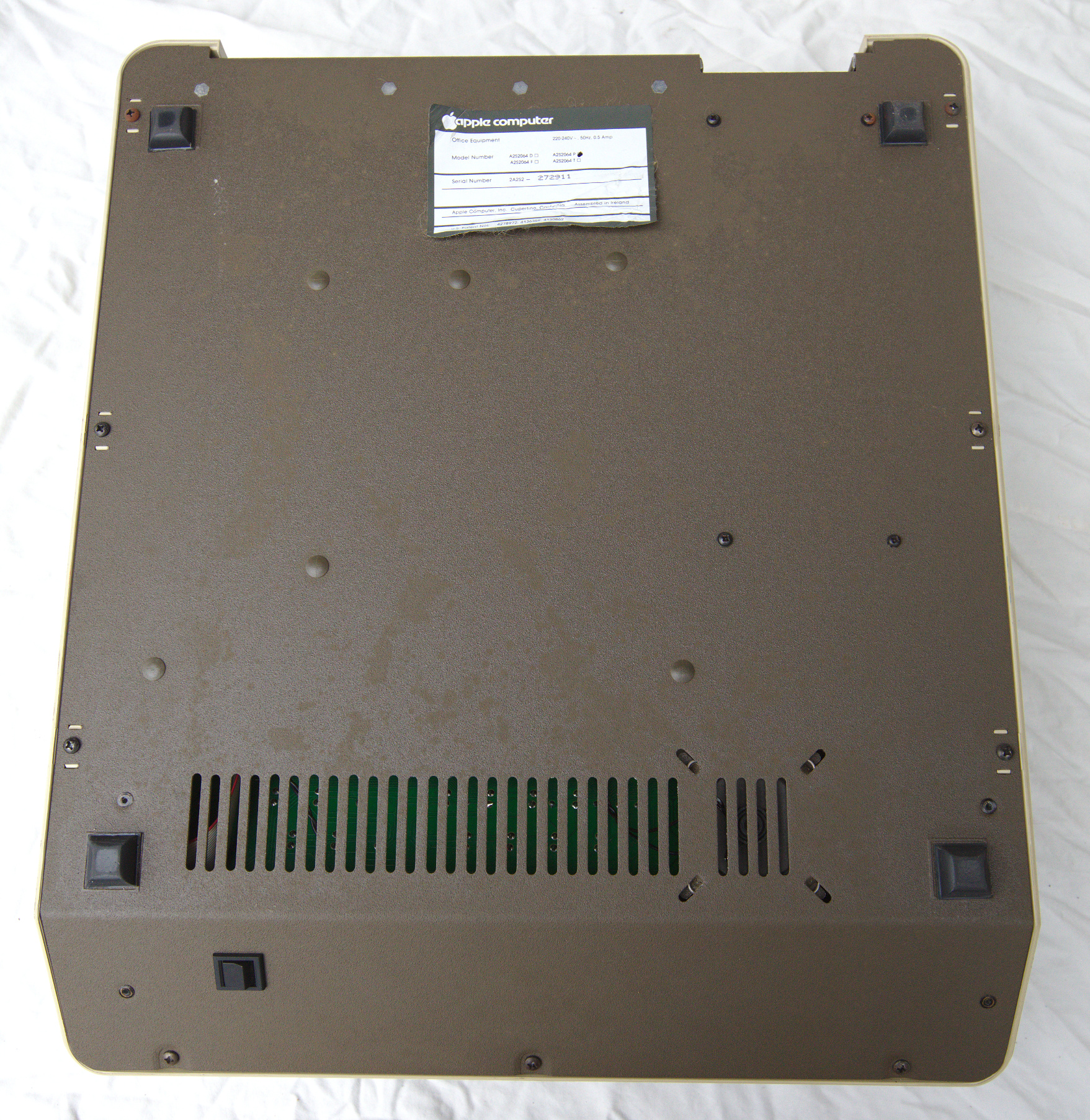
Bottom of an Apple IIe that was sold to the Australian market, showing original manufacturing sticker, and marked "Assembled in Ireland"

The Apple IIe keyboard differed depending on what region of the world it was sold in. Sometimes the differences were very minor, such as extra local language characters and symbols printed on certain keycaps (e.g. French accented characters on the Canadian IIe such as "à", "é", "ç", etc., or the British pound "£" symbol on the UK IIe) while other times the layout and shape of keys greatly differed (e.g. a European IIe). In order to access the local character set and keyboard layout, a user-accessible switch is found on the underside of the keyboard — flipping it will instantly switch the video output and keyboard input from the US character set to the local set. To support this, special double-capacity video and keyboard ROMs are used; in early motherboards they had to reside on a tiny circuit card that plugged into the socket. In some countries these localized IIes also support 50 Hz PAL video instead of the standard 60 Hz NTSC video and the different 220/240 volt power of that region. An equivalent of the "PAL color card" for the earlier Apple II Europlus model was integrated into the motherboard of these IIes, so that color graphics are available without the addition of a slot card.

Another difference with the European IIe is the Auxiliary slot physically moved in location so it is in line and in front of slot 3, preventing both slots from being used simultaneously for full-sized cards. A few third-party cards are affected by this; some European cards plug into both slots simultaneously and are thus unusable on American IIes, and some American cards do not fit into the case of European IIes because the European location of the Auxiliary slot leaves less room for them.

=== European Platinum IIe (hybrid) ===
During approximately the same time period that the Platinum IIe was being produced (1987), Apple released an alternative machine for the European market. It reused the original Apple IIe case mold and keyboard, but both were redyed in the platinum color scheme—including the metal ID badges which were recolored from dark brown to platinum, blending them into the case lid. Additionally, the sticker over the keyboard power indicator was labeled "65C02" rather than "Enhanced". Internally it used the same (newer) motherboard found in the Platinum IIe with reduced chip count. Notably absent is the numeric keypad and standardized keyboard layout found on the Platinum IIe.

This cosmetic reissue of the classic IIe, with new motherboard and new coloring scheme, was only available in Europe, and therefore also had regional differences mentioned above. It has been rumored that a small number of these machines were made available in the Canadian and US markets, using the standard North American keyboard and motherboard (photographic evidence of this North American variant can be found in some period Apple II magazines). This hybrid platinum model is somewhat rare.

== Upgrades ==
=== Apple IIGS upgrade kit ===
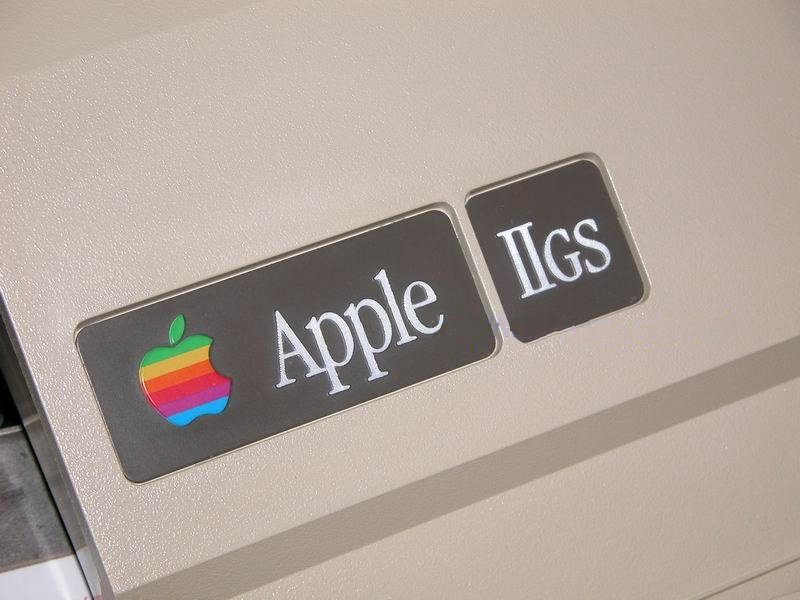
The replacement ID badges for the front lid, used in the Apple IIe-to-IIGS upgrade

When the Apple IIGS computer was introduced in September 1986, Apple announced it would be making an upgrade kit for the IIe. The upgrade cost US$500, plus the trade-in of the user's existing Apple IIe motherboard and baseplate.

Users would bring their Apple IIe machines in to an authorized dealership, where the 65C02-based IIe motherboard and lower baseboard of the case were swapped for a 65C816-based Apple IIGS motherboard with a new baseboard. New metal sticker ID badges replaced those on the front of the Apple IIe, rebranding the machine. Retained were the upper half of the IIe case, the keyboard, speaker, and power supply. Original IIGS motherboards (those produced between 1986 and mid-1989) had electrical connections for the IIe power supply and keyboard present, although only about half of the units produced had the physical plug connectors factory-soldered in.

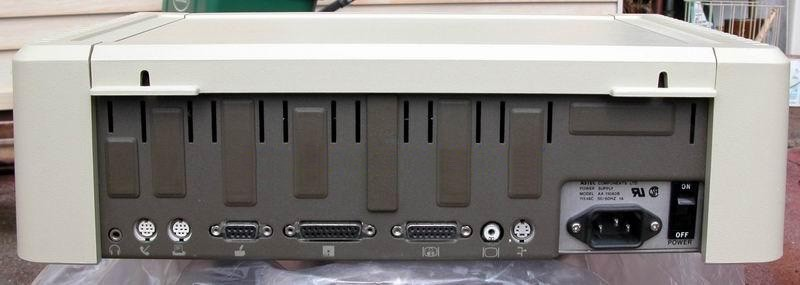
Back view of IIGS upgrade. Note the new port openings and connectors.

The upgrade kit proved unpopular as it did not include a mouse; the keyboard did not mimic all the features of the Apple Desktop Bus keyboard; and some cards designed for the Apple IIGS did not fit in the Apple IIe's slanted case. In the end, most users found they were not saving much, once they had to purchase a 3.5-inch floppy drive, analog RGB monitor, and mouse.

For a time, the Western Design Center (the company that designed the 16-bit 65C816 processor used in the Apple IIGS) also sold a 16-bit 65C802 processor that was a drop-in, pin-compatible replacement for the 65C02 that made the full 16-bit 65C816 instruction set available to the IIe, but using the same 8-bit data bus as the 65C02; however, this upgrade was insufficient, by itself, to allow IIGS software to run, as IIGS software additionally required the IIGS's firmware and specialized hardware.

Timeline of Apple II family
See also: Timeline of the Apple II series, Timeline of Macintosh models, and Timeline of Apple Inc. products

== See also ==
- Apple II peripheral cards
- Apple III
- Apple IIc
- Apple IIGS
- KansasFest – an annual convention of Apple II users
- List of publications and periodicals devoted to the Apple II
