= Videx =

American computer hardware manufacturer

Videx, Inc.
- Industry: Electronics
- Founded: 1979; 46 years ago
- Founder: Paul Davis
- Headquarters: Corvallis, Oregon

Videx, Inc., is a Corvallis, Oregon manufacturer of computer hardware such as access control products and data collection terminals. It was founded in 1979 by Paul Davis.

Its initial success came with the first release of the $345 Videoterm (80 column) display card in March 1980 and the $149 shift and custom keyboard mapping Enhancer II terminal card in November 1981, both for Apple II computers. Later, in 1984, it released its $379 UltraTerm expansion card boasting high-definition 96-pixel characters and up to 128 × 32 character display. These products became obsolete when Apple released the Apple IIe with most of the 80-column card hardware built-in - only a much simpler and cheaper RAM card was then required.

Videx also produced software, including Desktop Calendar (1984) for the Apple Lisa.

In the mid-1980s, the company started divesting from personal computer products in favor of data collection products, namely barcode readers.
