= Daniel Kottke =

American computer engineer (born 1954)

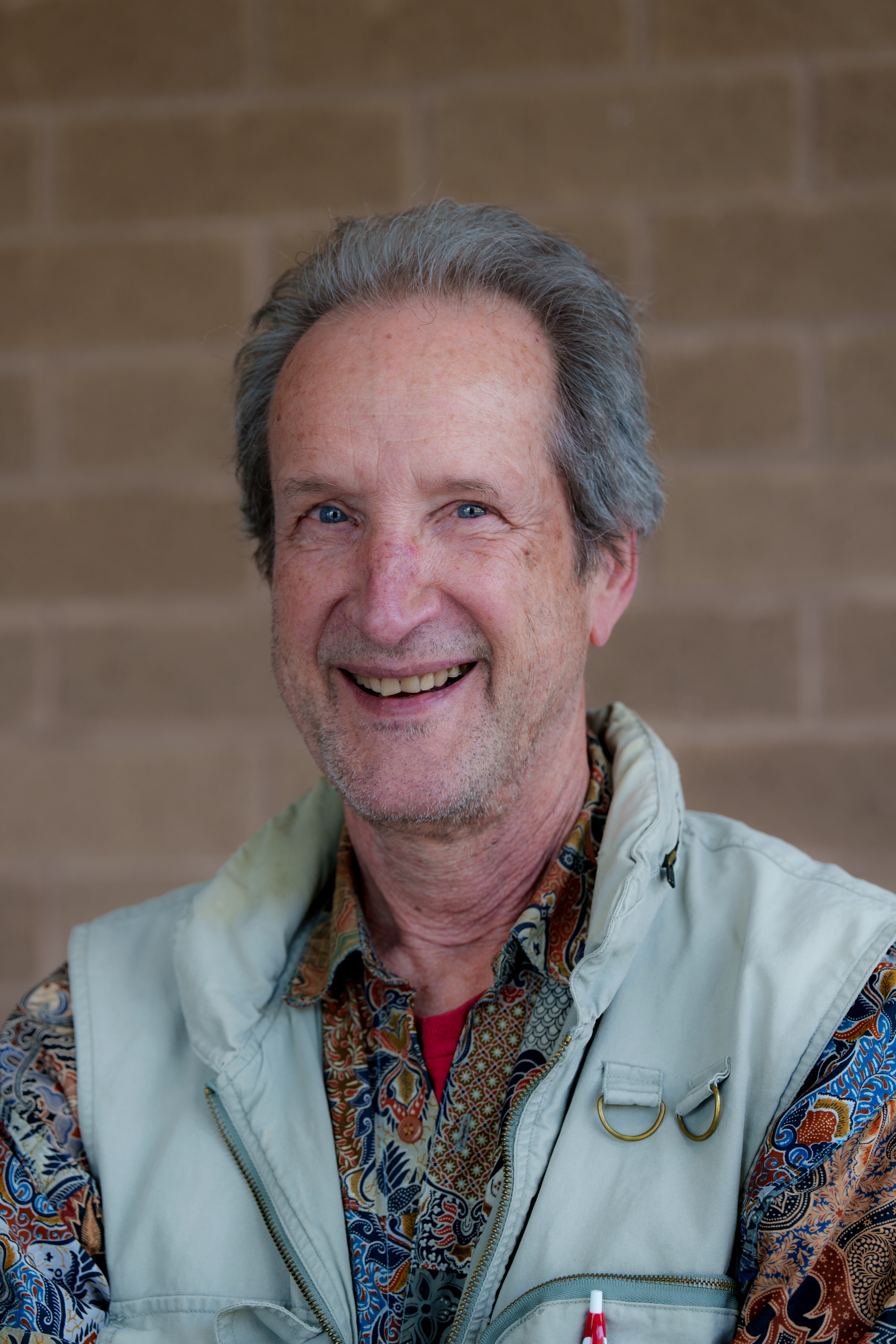
- Kottke in 2026
- Born: April 4, 1954 (age 72); Bronxville, New York, U.S.
- Education: Columbia University (BA)
- Known for: College friend of Steve Jobs and early employee of Apple Computer

Daniel Kottke (/ˈkɒtki/) is an American businessman known for having been a college friend of Steve Jobs and one of the first employees of Apple Inc. He met Jobs at Reed College in 1972, and they trekked together through India for spiritual enlightenment and to the All One Farm. In 1976, Kottke realized his interest in computers when Jobs hired him to assemble hobbyist computer projects and then to be a part-time employee at the newly founded Apple Computer. There, he debugged the Apple II family, prototyped the Apple III and Macintosh, and endured the IPO where Steve Wozniak assigned Kottke some of his own stock. He was portrayed in several films about Apple.

== Early life and education ==
Kottke was born on April 4, 1954, in Bronxville, New York.

Kottke first met Steve Jobs when they were both undergraduates at Reed College in 1972. In 1974, Kottke and Jobs made a trek in search of spiritual enlightenment to India to visit Neem Karoli Baba at his Kainchi ashram. When they reached the Neem Karoli ashram, it was almost deserted because Neem Karoli Baba had died in September 1973. They then made a long trek up a dry riverbed to an ashram of Haidakhan Babaji.

After returning from India, Kottke transferred to Columbia University in 1975 as a literature and music major. He stayed in touch with Jobs and they traveled together to fellow Reed College classmate Robert Friedland's All One Farm.

== Career ==
During his junior year at Columbia in 1976, Kottke was invited by Jobs to a hobbyist computer project where he assembled and tested computer boards during the summer. He also arranged for Kottke to work "for an hourly rate part-time assembling circuit boards for a company called Call Computer" that didn't require technical expertise. During that summer, Kottke realized his own interest in computers. Kottke stated in an interview with KQED/PBS that both he and Jobs's sister Patty (who was also assembling boards while watching TV) were the first part-time employees of Apple, and Bill Fernandez was the first full-time employee.

In 1977, after graduating from Columbia, Kottke joined Apple as full-time employee #12. He shared a house with Jobs and Jobs's girlfriend Chrisann Brennan near the Apple office in Cupertino.

Kottke spent another eight years with Apple debugging Apple II family printed circuit boards, building Apple III and Macintosh prototypes, and working on the design for the Macintosh keyboard. The Apple II gained popularity, eventually becoming one of the best selling personal computers of the 1970s and early 1980s. Kottke was one of the original members of the Macintosh development team and his signature is embossed inside the case of early production Macintosh computers.

After Apple filed IPO in 1980 to instant and significant financial profitability, Jobs refused to grant Kottke stock in the new company, stating that he "will give him zero". Therefore, co-founder Steve Wozniak later distributed a pool of $10 million worth of his own Apple stock to various early Apple employees, including Kottke. In her memoir of her life with Jobs, Chrisann Brennan states that she later asked Kottke about not receiving the stock options and that he replied: "Oh that ... Steve had offered me a job in marketing ... but I wasn't interested in marketing because I had something like a fever to understand the technology ... so I never pursued the marketing opportunity".

In 1982, when Time magazine featured a major but unflattering profile of Jobs, he publicly "berated" Kottke for having confirmed the fact to Time that he had a daughter, Lisa Brennan.

== In film ==
- Steve Jobs: The Man in the Machine (2015)
- Pirates of Silicon Valley (1999), with Marcus Giamatti as Kottke:

In an interview with Slashdot, Kottke stated that Pirates of Silicon Valley was "a great movie. Noah Wyle was just uncannily close to Jobs. Just unbelievable. I found myself thinking it was actually Steve on the screen." He also stated that in the film there were "all these scenes of the garage where it's like half a dozen people working, busily carrying things back and forth, and oscilloscopes" when he [Kottke] "was really the only person who worked in the garage. Woz would show up once a week with his latest to test it out, and Steve Jobs was on the phone a lot in the kitchen."

- Jobs (2013), with Lukas Haas as Kottke:

In an interview with Slashdot, Kottke stated that he was consulted on early versions of the screenplay for Jobs and noted, "Ashton's very good. I have no complaints with him at all, no complaints with his portrayal of Jobs. The complaint that people would rightly have about the film is that it portrays Woz as not having the same vision as Steve Jobs, which is really unfair." He said that the early versions of the screenplay "were painful. Really painful. I forwarded the first draft to Mike Markkula because they wanted his feedback, and Mike took such a bad reaction to it, he wouldn't have anything more to do with the project. By the time it got to the fourth draft, it was okay. It wasn't making me cringe." Kottke also outlined various areas that were both accurate and inaccurate in the film. Bill Fernandez was part of the same interview but stated that he didn't see the film because "the whole thing is a work of fiction, and I don't want to be upset by all the things that the screenwriter has invented and don't represent the truth". Kottke responded that he didn't think of the film as fiction because "I was involved early on in the film, and they really, sincerely tried to make it as accurate as they could".

In the same interview, Bill Fernandez and Kottke commented on the characterization of Rod Holt (portrayed by actor Ron Eldard). Kottke disputed the characterization, noting that: "What completely cracked us all up is the scene where Rod arrives for the first time. Rod comes up wearing leathers, riding up on a motorcycle with long hair ... he's like this motorcycle dude. It just cracked us all up." Fernandez had not seen the film at the time of the interview, and was also surprised by this portrayal. Holt, however, according to Kottke, "thought it was hilarious". As for why he may have been characterized this way, Kottke states that, "Rod was really into dirt bikes. And I never saw him riding one, but he talked about it all the time. So the author just had him riding up on a motorcycle. I liked that guy. I met him on the set. I had no idea who he was when I met him because he doesn't look at all like Rod, he has long straight hair and he's wearing leathers." Fernandez, who was equally amused by this vision of Holt responded by asking, "Who could this possibly be in the Apple universe? ... It seems to me that there's a lot of fan fiction about Apple Computer and about Steve Jobs, and I think that this is the biggest, flashiest piece of fan fiction that there's been to date."

The TV show John Wants Answers took Steve Wozniak, Kottke, and Andy Hertzfeld through each film scene and discussed how the events actually occurred.

- Steve Jobs (2015), mentioned in dialogue.

In an interview with CNN, Kottke stated that seeing the movie was a bit of a shock to him and that he enjoyed it very much. "It took me a few days after seeing the film ... I was surprised to see what a dominant character Lisa became. I found that very gratifying to see. It was very much a caricature ... [but] Aaron Sorkin did such a good job."
