= Adam Saunders =

American actor and filmmaker

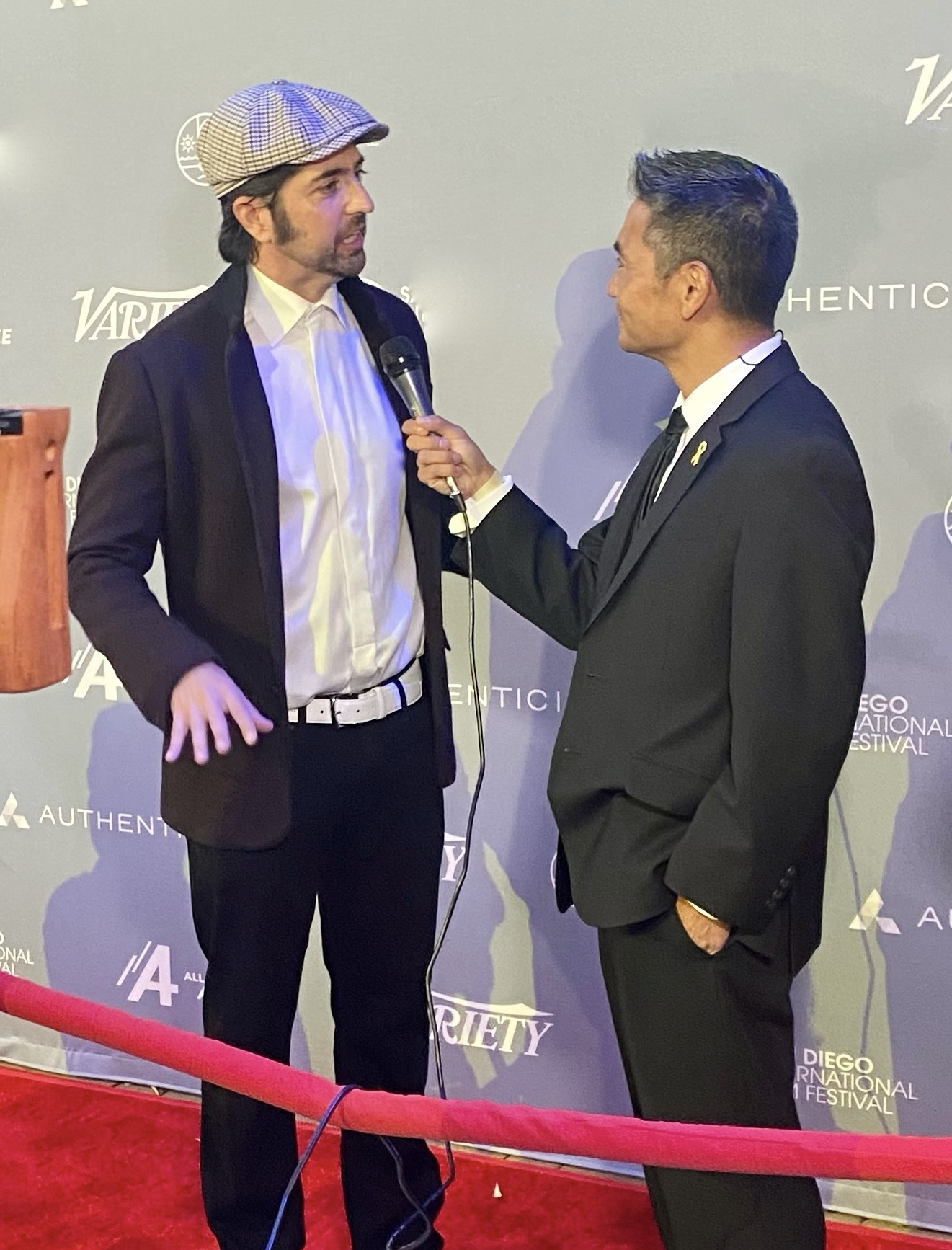
- Saunders at San Diego International Film Festival - 2022
- Born: United States
- Education: Duke University (BA); Yale University (MFA)
- Occupations: Actor, director, producer, and writer

Adam Saunders is an American actor, director, producer, and writer. He is a founding member of Footprint Features.

== Biography ==
Saunders graduated high school at Richardson High School, earned a drama degree from Duke University, and a master's in acting from the Yale School of Drama.

In 2007, Saunders started Footprint Features, a Los Angeles-based production company.

In 2011, Saunders produced and acted in Family Weekend, starring Kristin Chenoweth, and Joey King. The film was written by Matt K. Turner, directed by Benjamin Epps, and executive produced by the Bedford Falls Company. In 2013, he produced and acted in About Alex, starring Aubrey Plaza, Max Greenfield, Jason Ritter, and Jane Levy, and written and directed by Jesse Zwick. The film was executive produced by Edward Zwick and Marshall Herskovitz and played at the 2013 TriBeCa Film Festival. In 2017, he produced and acted in Oren Uziel's crime thriller Shimmer Lake which was named as Variety’s 2017 standout for the Academy Award for Best Original Screenplay.

In 2018, Saunders produced the Netflix romantic comedy When We First Met starring Adam Devine and Alexandra Daddario, written by John Whittington (screenwriter) and directed by Ari Sandel. The film was produced alongside Mason Novick and Wonderland Sound and Vision.

In 2022, Saunders made his directorial film debut with Dotty & Soul, an indie comedy in which he starred alongside Tony and Emmy winner Leslie Uggams. Dotty & Soul premiered at the 2022 San Diego Film Festival. In 2023, it sold to Showtime.

Also in 2022, Saunders produced Darby and the Dead starring Riele Downs and Auli'i Cravalho for 20th Century Studios. The film was directed by Silas Howard, shot in Cape Town, South Africa and was released on December 2, 2022 on Hulu.

In 2023, Saunders signed on to star in the comedy Re-Election, alongside Tony Danza and Bex Taylor-Klaus. Re-Election was Saunders' second directorial effort. The film was set in Richardson, Texas and shot in Baton Rouge, Louisiana. The film was distributed theatrically by Picturehouse and was released on October 10, 2025. The film debuted in New York City at the Regal Union Square, Angelika in Dallas and the Springs Cinema in Atlanta.

== Filmography ==
Year	Title	Director	Producer	Writer
2013	Family Weekend	No	Yes	No
2014	About Alex	No	Yes	No
2017	Shimmer Lake	No	Yes	No
2018	When We First Met	No	Yes	No
2022	Darby and the Dead	No	Yes	No
2022	Dotty & Soul	Yes	Yes	Yes
2025	Re-Election	Yes	Yes	Yes

=== Acting roles ===
Television

Year	Title	Role	Notes
2006	Law & Order: Criminal Intent	Brendan Cory	1 episode
2007-2008	The Game	Waiter	2 episodes
2008	Meet Me in the Graveyard	Ace	
2020	The Trials of Gabriel Fernandez	Informant (voice)	1 episode

Film

Year	Title	Role	Notes	Ref.
2011	The Roommate	Handsome Guy		
2013	Family Weekend	Rick		
2014	About Alex	Night Editor		
2017	Shimmer Lake	State Trooper		
2018	Confidence	Boss	Short film	
2022	Dotty & Soul	Ethan Cox		
2025	Re-Election	Jimmy Bauer		
