= Bex Taylor-Klaus =

American actor (born 1994)

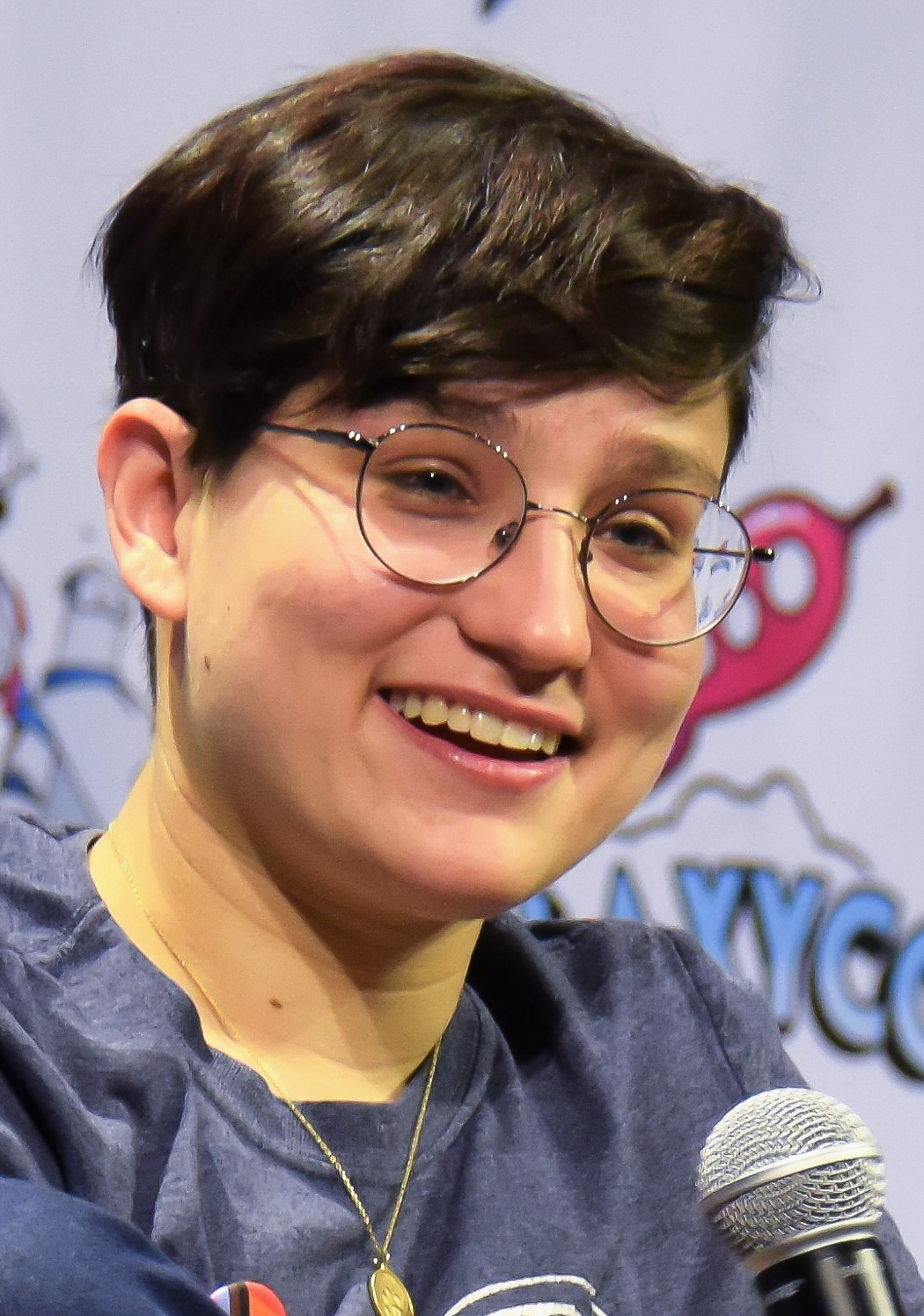
- Taylor-Klaus at GalaxyCon Richmond in 2020
- Born: Rebecca Edison Taylor-Klaus; August 12, 1994 (age 32); Atlanta, Georgia, U.S.
- Occupation: Actor
- Years active: 2012–present
- Spouse: Alicia Sixtos (m. 2020)

Rebecca Edison "Bex" Taylor-Klaus (born August 12, 1994) is an American actor. They rose to fame for their starring role as Bullet on the crime drama series The Killing (2013). They gained further prominence with roles as Sin on the superhero drama series Arrow (2013–15), Lex on the comedy series House of Lies (2014), as Audrey Jensen on the horror series Scream (2015–16), and the voice of Katie "Pidge" Holt on the Netflix animated series Voltron: Legendary Defender (2016–18). They played the character Bishop in the drama series Deputy, which aired from January to April 2020.

== Early life ==
Taylor-Klaus was born in Atlanta, Georgia, to a Jewish family. Taylor-Klaus began acting by performing Shakespeare in an after-school program while in the third grade, and it became a consistent part of their extracurricular and summer activities. They also performed in a high school improvisation troupe and played several roles before completing high school. Working with friends, they also started a junior high school acting troupe to train young actors. In addition to drama, Taylor-Klaus was an accomplished athlete, starting at catcher on the high school varsity softball team as a freshman and also playing third base. They have two siblings; Syd Taylor-Klaus and Josh Taylor-Klaus. In mid-2012, Taylor-Klaus moved to Los Angeles to pursue an acting career, attending Bridges Academy.

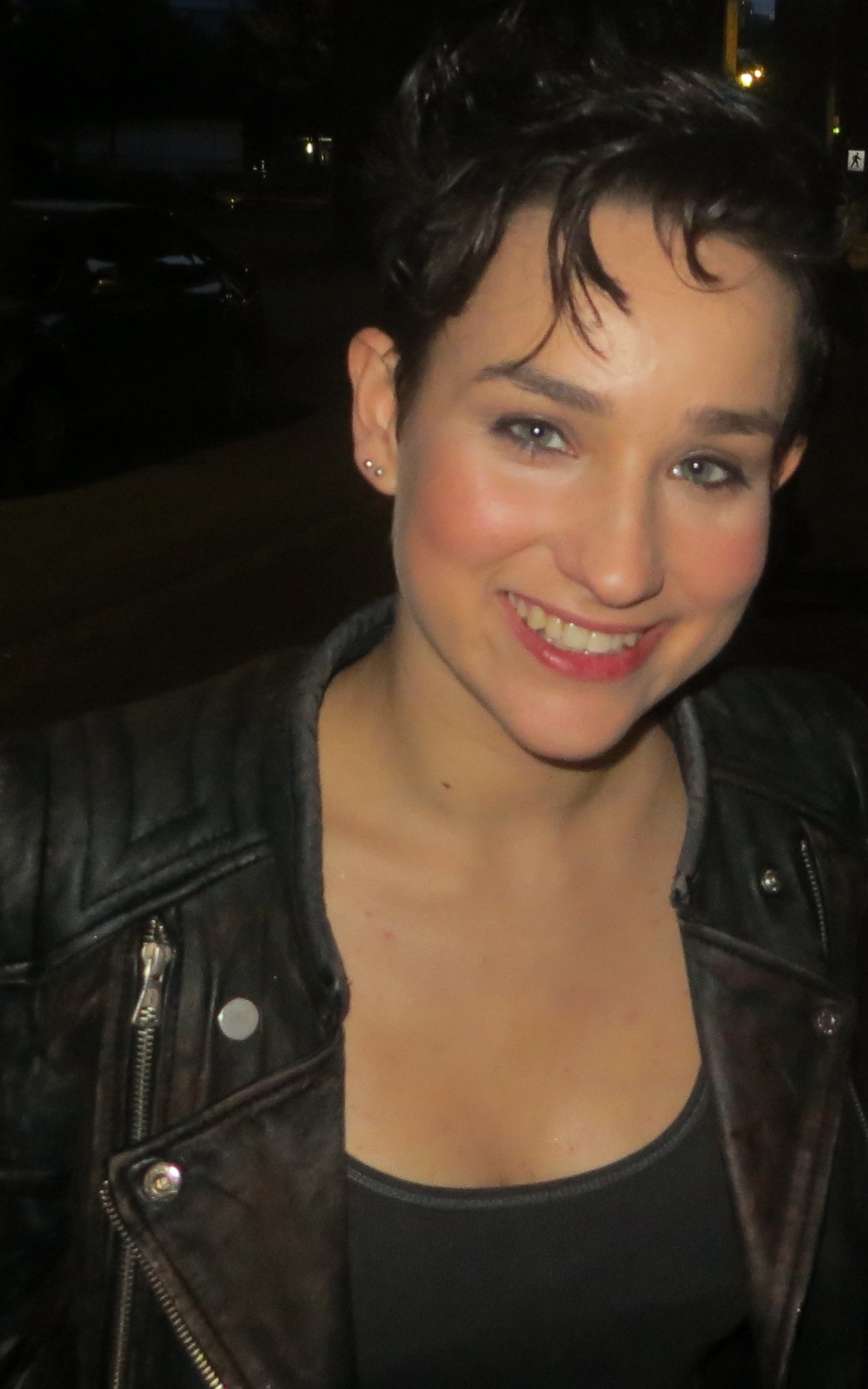
Taylor-Klaus on the set of The Killing in 2013

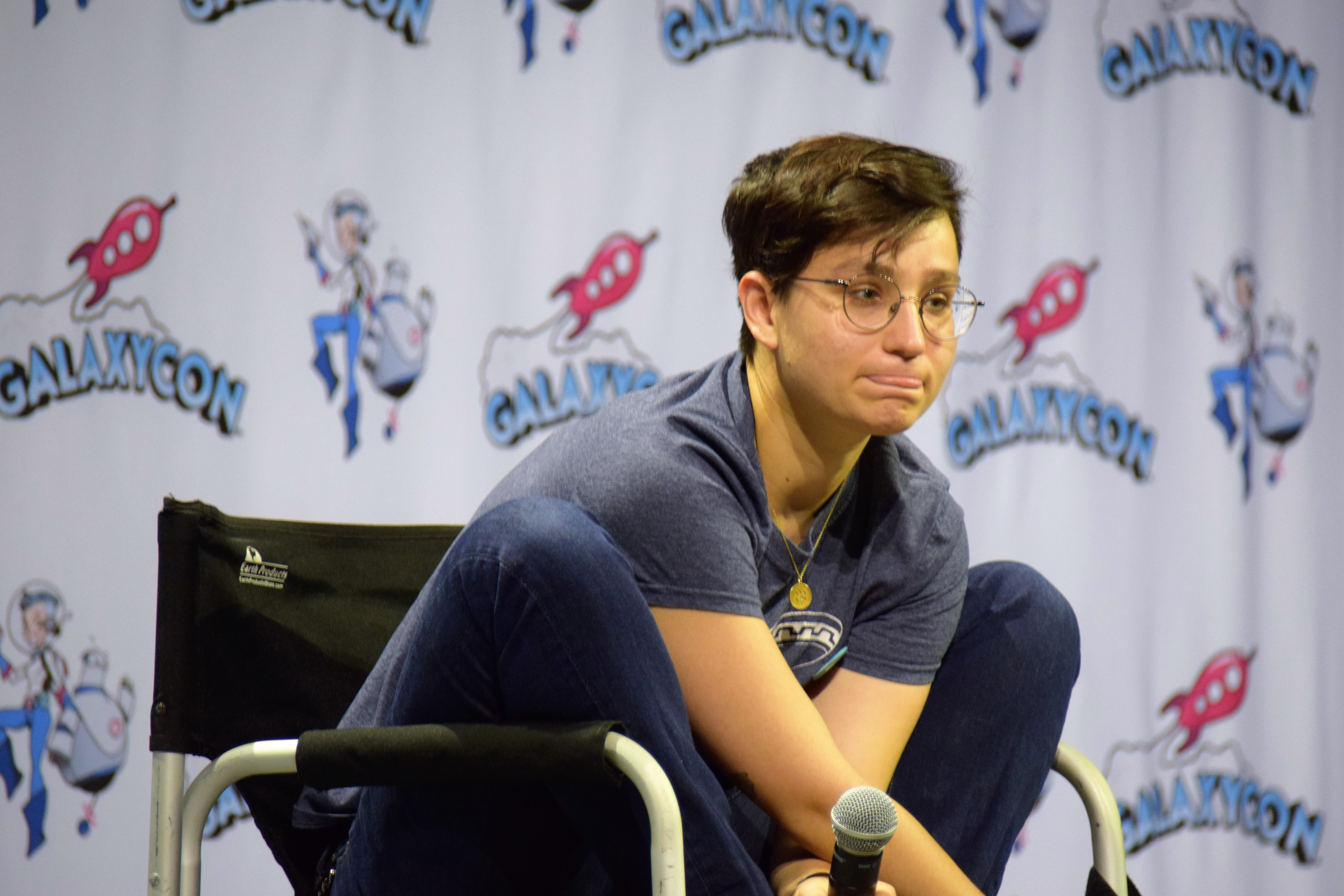
Bex Taylor-Klaus Q&A Panel Galaxy Con Richmond 2020

== Career ==
=== 2012–2014: Early career and breakthrough ===
Taylor-Klaus began acting in Shakespeare plays while in the third grade. However, their first professional acting role was that of Bullet, a homeless street-wise lesbian teen, on the third season of the AMC crime drama series The Killing, which aired in 2013. Writing about playing Bullet, Taylor-Klaus said: "to be an actor is to want to visit the dark places that humans strive so hard to stay away from.”

From 2013 to 2015, Taylor-Klaus played the recurring role of Sin in The CW superhero drama series Arrow.

=== 2015–present: Further success ===
Taylor-Klaus gained further success with their starring role of Audrey Jensen, a bi-curious teenager helping friends investigate a serial killer, in the first two seasons of the MTV horror drama series Scream. They appeared on the series from 2015 to 2016.

After gaining prominence from roles in The Killing and Arrow, they went on to play several guest roles in numerous television series, including Glee and iZombie. In 2016, they began voicing the starring role of Katie "Pidge" Holt in the Netflix animated series Voltron: Legendary Defender.

Taylor-Klaus had a starring role as Taylor in the slasher horror film Hell Fest (2018). They also starred as Hannah Perez in the 2018 musical comedy film Dumplin', which is a film adaptation of Julie Murphy’s New York Times bestselling young adult novel. The film, which co-stars Jennifer Aniston, was directed by Anne Fletcher. Taylor-Klaus also played Violette Paich in Mario Sorrenti’s horror film Discarnate (2018).

Taylor-Klaus starred in the 2025 comedy Re-Election with Tony Danza and director and lead actor Adam Saunders.

== Personal life ==
Taylor-Klaus was diagnosed with ADHD in elementary school and played multiple sports, including baseball, which they said helped to control it.

Taylor-Klaus has a dog named Bullet, after their first major role in The Killing.

In November 2016, Taylor-Klaus came out as gay on Twitter, saying: "hello my name is bex and yes the rumors are true I am v gay" In July 2018, Taylor-Klaus came out as non-binary in a similar tweet and stated a preference for they/them pronouns. Later on the same year they eventually came out as a non-binary trans person.

In August 2019, Taylor-Klaus got engaged to their girlfriend, actress Alicia Sixtos, and married in October 2020.

In April 2022, Taylor-Klaus discussed on an interview their experience of having top surgery.

== Filmography ==
=== Film ===
| Year | Title | Role | Notes |
|---|---|---|---|
| 2012 | Mental Intervention | Debbie | Short film |
| 2013 | Last Seen | Becca | Short film |
| 2014 | The Night Is Ours | Morgan | Short film |
| 2015 | Riley | Riley | Short film |
| 2015 | The Last Witch Hunter | Bronwyn | |
| 2018 | Hell Fest | Taylor Ann Smythe | |
| 2018 | Discarnate | Violette Paich | |
| 2018 | Dumplin' | Hannah Perez | |
| 2019 | Blackbird | Chris | |
| 2023 | Trim Season | Dusty | |
| 2024 | I Wish You All the Best | Shayna | |
| 2025 | Re-Election | Noa Polly | |

=== Television ===
| Year | Title | Role | Notes |
|---|---|---|---|
| 2012 | Hit Me Up! | Themself | 1 episode |
| 2013 | The Killing | Bullet | Main role (9 episodes) |
| 2013–2019 | Arrow | Cindy / Sin | Recurring role (9 episodes) |
| 2014 | House of Lies | Lex | Recurring role (6 episode) |
| 2014 | Longmire | Vivian | Episode: "Of Children and Travelers" |
| 2014 | Robot Chicken | Hermione Granger / Abby the Cow (voice) | Episode: "The Hobbit: There and Bennigan's" |
| 2015 | The Social Experiment | Leyna | Recurring role (5 episodes) |
| 2015 | The Librarians | Amy Meyer | Episode: "And the Rule of Three" |
| 2015 | Glee | Goth Girl | Episode: "2009" |
| 2015 | iZombie | Teresa Giovanni | 2 episodes |
| 2015–2016 | Scream | Audrey Jensen | Main role (24 episodes) |
| 2016–2018 | Voltron: Legendary Defender | Katie "Pidge" Holt (voice) | Main role (73 episodes) |
| 2018 | Here and Now | Dex Reynolds | 2 episodes |
| 2019 | 13 Reasons Why | Casey Ford | Recurring role; season 3 |
| 2020 | Deputy | Brianna Bishop | Main role |
| 2021 | Adventure Time: Distant Lands | Blaine | Episode: "Wizard City" |

=== Web ===
| Year | Title | Role | Notes |
|---|---|---|---|
| 2016 | Scream: If I Die | Audrey Jensen | Episode: "I Love All of You... Mostly" |
| 2022 | Dirty Laundry on Dropout | Self | Episode: "Who Hid $20,000 Inside a Bowflex" |

=== Video games ===
| Year | Title | Role | Notes |
|---|---|---|---|
| 2017 | DreamWorks Voltron VR Chronicles | Pidge (voice) | |
| 2020 | Star Wars: Squadrons | Keo Venzee (voice) | |

== Awards and nominations ==
| Year | Awards | Category | Nominated for | Result | Ref. |
|---|---|---|---|---|---|
| 2014 | Joey Award | Young Ensemble Cast in a Dramatic TV Series | The Killing | Won | |
| 2014 | Joey Award | International Actress Television Lead or Supporting Role that was filmed in Canada | The Killing | Won | |
| 2016 | TV Guide Awards | Favorite Ensemble (shared with cast) | Scream | Nominated | |
| 2017 | 6th Annual BTVA Awards | BTVA People's Choice Award for Best Vocal Ensemble in a New Television Series (shared with cast) | Voltron: Legendary Defender | Won | |
| 2017 | 6th Annual BTVA Awards | BTVA Television Voice Acting Award - Best Vocal Ensemble in a New Television Series (shared with cast) | Voltron: Legendary Defender | Nominated | |
| 2018 | 7th Annual BTVA Awards | BTVA People's Choice Award for Best Vocal Ensemble in a Television Series (shared with cast) | Voltron: Legendary Defender | Won | |
| 2018 | 7th Annual BTVA Awards | BTVA Television Voice Acting Award - Best Vocal Ensemble in a Television Series (shared with cast) | Voltron: Legendary Defender | Nominated | |
