= Family Weekend =

- Theatrical poster
- Directed by: Benjamin Epps
- Written by: Matt K. Turner
- Produced by: Adam Saunders; Chris Aronoff
- Starring: Kristin Chenoweth; Matthew Modine; Olesya Rulin; Joey King; Eddie Hassell; Adam Saunders; Robbie Tucker; Chloe Bridges; Shirley Jones
- Cinematography: Christopher Norr
- Edited by: Benjamin Epps; Colleen Halsey
- Music by: Russ Howard III; Mateo Messina
- Production companies: Footprint Features; The Bedford Falls Company
- Distributed by: ARC Entertainment
- Release date: March 29, 2013
- Running time: 106 minutes
- Country: United States
- Language: English

Family Weekend is a 2013 American comedy-drama film directed by Benjamin Epps and starring Kristin Chenoweth, Matthew Modine, Olesya Rulin, Joey King, Eddie Hassell, Adam Saunders, Chloe Bridges and Shirley Jones.

== Plot ==
Emily (Olesya Rulin) is a speed rope-jumping champion of her school and general overachiever. She is praised by one love-lorn boy at school (though she is mocked by other students) for her achievements, but her family does not care about her jump roping success.

On Friday, Emily wins the regional championship in speed rope-jumping and moves on to the state championship to be held the coming weekend. She looks at the audience only to find nobody from her family cheering for her. She confronts her family at home during a family dinner, but her mother Samantha (Kristin Chenoweth), father Duncan (Matthew Modine), brother Jackson (Eddie Hassell), and sister Lucinda (Joey King) all continue to be wrapped up in themselves and ignore her plea to take her jump-roping seriously.

Inspired by an Animal Planet segment her younger brother Mickey (Robbie Tucker) is watching on treating Tasmanian devils by sedating the creatures so treatment can be administered, as a desperate attempt to bring the family back together, Emily secretly drugs her parents' wine with her mother's sedatives. She then binds each of them to a chair. With help from her siblings, psychiatrist grandmother GG (Shirley Jones), and her school friend and neighbor Kat (Chloe Bridges), during the weekend, she attempts to teach her parents how to parent.

While her father soon succumbs, praising her, her mother still unconvinced, scolds her often. After an emotional one-to-one with her mother that brings tears from Emily, she ultimately succeeds in both bringing her parents back together and causing all the members of the family to realize that everyone in the family is important and needs support.

By the time Deputy Tucker and Officer Reyes show up Sunday morning due to videos Kat had put online about the kidnapping, her parents and the neighbor have changed their attitudes and help Emily escape to get to the state finals. During her jump competition, all her family finally appear at the championship to cheer her on. She momentarily stops jumping in surprise when she sees her family, but still wins second place. Deputy Tucker and Officer Reyes also show up and arrest her for having attacked her mother's co-worker/faux-boyfriend at her home who had inadvertently interrupted her kidnapping plot.

Emily is later seen at a youth correctional facility with her jump-rope keeping her company, as her family comes to bring her back home upon her sentence expiring.

== Cast ==
- Olesya Rulin as Emily Smith-Dungy, the main character who is 16 years old. She loves jumping rope, and she is the brain of the operation of bringing her family together.
- Kristin Chenoweth as Samantha Smith-Dungy, the wife of Duncan Dungy, and the mother of Emily, Jackson, Lucinda, and Mickey Smith-Dungy. She is a hardworking business woman and because of her being so focused of her job, it is one of the reasons why the family is so separate.
- Matthew Modine as Duncan Dungy, the husband of Samantha Smith-Dungy, and the father of Emily, Jackson, Lucinda, and Mickey Smith Dungy. He is more focused on his artwork than taking care of his family and that is one of the reasons Emily sets up her plan.
- Joey King as Lucinda Smith-Dungy, a 9-year-old method actress, who dresses up and acts like characters from usually restricted film, including Taxi Driver, and dresses up like a 12-year-old Jodie Foster's character Iris.
- Eddie Hassell as Jackson Smith-Dungy, a 15-year-old "raging homosexual" as said by his older sister Emily and himself, though he is not actually gay, but he pretends to be so people will think he is more creative and so he will get attention from his father.
- Adam Saunders as Rick, Samantha Smith-Dungy's co-worker and lover, who gets taken hostage by Emily, and plays the role of the film's comic foil.
- Robbie Tucker as Mickey Smith-Dungy, a 7-year-old boy who is obsessed with nature and animals.
- Chloe Bridges as Kat, Emily's frenemy and polar opposite.
- Shirley Jones as Grandma Gail Dungy "GG", the mother of Duncan, the mother-in-law of Samantha, and the grandmother of the Smith-Dungy kids.
- Peter Gail as Deputy Tucker, a male officer who arrests Emily.
- Lisa Lauren Smith as Officer Reyes, a female officer who arrests Emily.
