= About Alex =

- Theatrical release poster
- Directed by: Jesse Zwick
- Written by: Jesse Zwick
- Produced by: Adam Saunders; Edward Zwick; Marshall Herskovitz
- Starring: Nate Parker; Jason Ritter; Maggie Grace; Max Greenfield; Aubrey Plaza; Max Minghella; Jane Levy
- Cinematography: Andre Lascaris
- Edited by: Garret Price
- Music by: Joel P. West
- Production companies: The Bedford Falls Company; Footprint Features
- Distributed by: Screen Media Films
- Release date: August 8, 2014
- Running time: 96 minutes
- Country: United States
- Language: English

About Alex is a 2014 American drama film written and directed by Jesse Zwick. The film stars Nate Parker, Jason Ritter, Maggie Grace and Max Greenfield. It had its world premiere at the Tribeca Film Festival on April 17, 2014. Screen Media Films released it on August 8, 2014.

== Plot ==
The titular Alex (Jason Ritter) dresses himself at his old family home before filling a bathtub. After getting in, he posts a tweet, after a series of unanswered phone calls to his college friend Ben (Nate Parker), drops the phone into the water, and slits his wrists.

After hearing about Alex’s attempted suicide, his old college friends gather at his family’s country house: Ben and Siri (Maggie Grace), a married couple at a career crossroads; Josh (Max Greenfield), a disenchanted PhD candidate; Sarah (Aubrey Plaza), an un-happy M&A attorney; and Isaac (Max Minghella), a businessman from San Francisco and his date Kate (Jane Levy), who happens to work at a suicide hotline. Sarah suggests that they watch Alex in shifts while Josh suggests they confront Alex about his near suicide. Reunited for the first time in years, old flirtations are reignited.

Siri confides in Sarah that she may be pregnant, after receiving a dream job offer in Los Angeles. Josh is at a stalemate in writing his dissertation. Ben has been unable to finish his novel, and Sarah is left unfulfilled in her job as an attorney. The group is unable to clean the downstairs bathroom where Alex tried to kill himself and they rely solely on the upstairs bathroom. Sarah is hostile towards Kate because of her lingering feelings for Isaac but rekindles an old fling with Josh. Siri confides in Alex that Ben is having writer's block.

While fishing, the men come across a dog whom they name Timmy, and Kate goes food shopping with Sarah. The group gets high and drunk, and Kate agrees to monitor the suicide hotline despite the fact that she is high for the first time. Ben and Siri have a serious talk about their standing as a couple when Siri admits that she may be pregnant. After dinner, Siri, Ben, Sarah, Josh, and Alex then play a drinking game that turns hostile when Josh and Ben ask Alex why he tried to kill himself, causing a shift in the group dynamic. Afterward, Sarah rejects Josh and accosts him for not committing to her during their college years. In the meantime, Siri tells Alex she feels guilty for her and Ben’s problems, and they kiss. Empowered by her confrontation with Josh, Sarah later rejects Isaac's advances after he kisses her, citing that she is over him and what he has with Kate is real.

Josh and Ben have a talk when they encounter Sarah asks about Alex's whereabouts. They disperse to ensure that he has not tried another suicide attempt. Ben discovers Alex and Siri in the midst of making out (albeit clothed) and flees in Isaac’s rental car but crashes it into a tree. Meanwhile, Kate finds Isaac after a call and asks him to bed.

When Sunday arrives, Isaac offers to invest in Sarah and her culinary ambitions, and they playfully dance around the idea. Alex finds Ben, whose writer's block has been broken. The two reconcile and return to the house. After they return, Ben and Siri have a discussion about their relationship. As they all prepare to return to their respective lives, Alex announces that he is going to work with Kate at the suicide prevention hotline, and Ben is staying at the house to write for a while.

Before the group departs, they opt to take a group photo. Kate, after Isaac affirms his dedication to her, offers to take the photo. As the group poses, a flashback of Ben inviting Alex to their table in college appears.

== Cast ==
- Nate Parker as Ben
- Jason Ritter as Alex
- Maggie Grace as Siri
- Max Greenfield as Josh
- Aubrey Plaza as Sarah
- Max Minghella as Isaac
- Jane Levy as Kate

== Release ==
About Alex had its world premiere at the Tribeca Film Festival on April 17, 2014. Shortly after it was announced Screen Media Films had acquired distribution rights to the film. The film was released in a limited release and through video on demand on August 8, 2014.

== Reception ==
On Rotten Tomatoes the film has an approval rating of 45% based on reviews by 40 critics, with an average rating of 5.52/10. The website's consensus reads: "About Alex pointedly provokes comparisons to The Big Chill, but the script doesn't have enough substance to support them – or give its talented cast enough to work with." On Metacritic it has a score of 45% based on reviews from 18 critics, indicating "mixed or average" reviews.
