= Eddie Hassell =

American actor (1990–2020)

- Born: Ed Taylor Hassell; July 16, 1990; Corsicana, Texas, U.S.
- Died: November 1, 2020 (aged 30); Grand Prairie, Texas, U.S.
- Cause of death: Homicide by gunshot
- Occupation: Actor
- Years active: 2003–2017

Lord Ed Taylor Hassell (July 16, 1990 – November 1, 2020) was an American actor. His most notable role was the 2013 film Jobs, where he played Chris Espinosa.

== Life and career ==
Born in Corsicana, Texas, Hassell grew up riding in rodeos and after he moved to Los Angeles, he became a skateboarder, a skill he used in commercials.

Hassell played Phil Nance in ten episodes of the television series Surface, to which he was nominated for the Best Performance by a Supporting Young Actor in a Drama TV Series award in the 2006 Young Artist Awards.

In 2010, he played Clay in The Kids Are All Right.

In the 2013 film Jobs, he played Chris Espinosa; he also played Chris Oles in the 2017 film Bomb City.

== Death ==
Hassell died aged 30 on November 1, 2020, in Grand Prairie, Texas, after being shot in the stomach during what police characterized as a "random robbery". 18-year-old D'Jon Antone was arrested for the murder within days, and in February 2021, he was indicted by a grand jury on capital murder charges. On March 27, 2024, Antone was found guilty of murder and sentenced to 40 years in prison.

== Filmography ==
=== TV series ===
- 2004: Oliver Beene (1 episode)
- 2005–2006: Surface (10 episodes)
- 2006: Studio 60 on the Sunset Strip (1 episode)
- 2006–2007: 'Til Death (2 episodes)
- 2013: Devious Maids (5 episodes)
- 2015: Longmire (1 episode)

=== Films ===
- 2009: 2012
- 2010: The Kids Are All Right
- 2011: The Family Tree
- 2013: Jobs
- 2013: Family Weekend
- 2013: House of Dust
- 2016: Warrior Road
- 2017: Bomb City
- 2017: Oh Lucy! (final role)
