= Darby and the Dead =

2022 film directed by Silas Howard

- Official release poster
- Directed by: Silas Howard
- Written by: Wenonah Wilms; Becca Greene
- Produced by: Adam Saunders; Eddie Rubin; Mac Hendrickson
- Starring: Riele Downs; Auliʻi Cravalho; Chosen Jacobs; Asher Angel; Wayne Knight; Derek Luke; Tony Danza
- Cinematography: Ante Cheng
- Edited by: Kate Hickey
- Music by: Roger Neill
- Production companies: 20th Century Studios; Footprint Features
- Distributed by: Hulu
- Release date: December 2, 2022
- Running time: 100 minutes
- Country: United States
- Language: English

Darby and the Dead is a 2022 American supernatural teen comedy film directed by Silas Howard, written by Wenonah Wilms and Becca Greene, and starring Riele Downs as Darby Harper, along with Auliʻi Cravalho, Chosen Jacobs, Asher Angel, Wayne Knight, Derek Luke, and Tony Danza.

Originally titled Darby Harper Wants You to Know, the film was announced in October 2021, and began filming in South Africa in February 2022. It was released by 20th Century Studios as a Hulu original film on December 2, 2022. It received mixed reviews from critics.

== Plot ==
When Darby Harper was seven, she and her mother were swept by a wave that drowned them. Darby was brought back to life, but her mother perished. Since then, Darby gained the ability to see and communicate with ghosts. She started a side business to help "Deados" move on to the afterlife by helping them take care of things they could not do while alive. This has caused her to become distant from everyone at school, including her former friend Capricorn "Capri" Donahue, the popular cheerleader. Darby's only true friend is the school's former janitor Gary, a "Stayer" who is waiting for his wife Linda to pass on so that he can move on too.

Darby meets new student Alex who is the school's mascot and is drawn to her, despite her attempts to dissuade him. She also comes into conflict with Capri over her boyfriend James who, contrary to her, is kind and considerate. While using a hair straightener in the bathroom, Capri electrocutes herself and dies. Darby is immediately visited by her and comes to grips with the fact that she is dead and needs to pass on. She also discovers that she can psychically control things with her mind. Capri constantly pesters Darby before deciding that her goal before moving on is to throw her seventeenth birthday party. Darby reluctantly agrees with Capri training her to think and act like her and her friends. After regaining her cheerleading abilities from her childhood, Darby manages to get in with Capri's friends, though she is told to stay away from Alex due to him being the mascot.

With Capri's help, Darby posits celebrating her birthday anyway to her friends and to raise "electrocution awareness" at school. Capri's friends agree and, thanks to Capri's influence, Darby starts to become popular among her peers. She further begins to bond with James who has stayed home from school for a few days following Capri's death. After returning, everyone at school begins to suspect that the two are dating, much to Capri's friend's chagrin. Darby's new life begins to intrude on her old one as she misses a date with Alex and keeps passing on helping Gary's friend Mel pass on. Capri initially becomes jealous of Darby's influence over the party, but is calmed by Gary and Mel. She goes to apologize, only to discover Darby's supposed relationship with James and angrily burns her house and begins to haunt James, forcing him to "break up" with Darby.

The day of the party arrives and Darby comes in an effort to find Capri. She finds James talking to her via a Ouija board and Capri begins to mock Darby and send the board flying around the party. When she threatens further humiliation, Darby finally reveals to everyone her secret and the fact that she pretends to look down on everyone because of her own flaws. Darby returns to being ignored by everyone at school, but is visited by Capri who in an effort to make up for fighting with her, finds Darby's mother who has been watching her from afar in an effort to see how she can handle herself. Capri finally accepts Darby's friendship and moves on to the afterlife.

Darby decides to continue cheerleading, having made up with the squad and remains friends with James. She runs into Gary again who is close to visiting his wife and he reveals that Mel has finally moved on as well, thanks to Alex. It is revealed he can also see ghosts as well as break the fourth wall as Darby had done throughout the film, after having fallen into a coma. The two decide to start dating and work their afterlife business together while a bird, implied to be Capri based on her belief in reincarnation, watches from afar.

== Cast ==
- Riele Downs as Darby Harper
  - Milan Maphike as Darby 7-year-old
  - Emily Maphike as Darby 13/14-year-old
- Auliʻi Cravalho as Capricorn "Capri" Donahue
- Chosen Jacobs as Alex
- Asher Angel as James Harris
- Wayne Knight as Mel
- Derek Luke as Ben Harper
- Tony Danza as Gary
- Nicole Maines as Piper
- Kylie Liya Page as Taylor
- Genneya Walton as Bree
- Dean Goldblum as Todd
- Kim Syster as Darby's Mom
- Danica Jones as Coach Paula

== Production ==
The film's logo.

In October 2021, it was announced that 20th Century Studios had acquired Wenonah Wilms and Becca Greene's spec script Darby Harper Wants You to Know. The film was set to be directed by Silas Howard, and Storm Reid was initially cast as the title character. Reid and Robyn Simpson were also set to executive produce the film under their production company A Seed & Wings.

By February 2022, Riele Downs, Auliʻi Cravalho, Asher Angel, Chosen Jacobs, and Derek Luke joined the film, with Downs replacing Reid, who dropped out due to scheduling conflicts. Genneya Walton and Tony Danza also joined the film that same month, with filming having commenced. Filming took place in Cape Town, South Africa. By March 2022, Wayne Knight and Nicole Maines had joined the cast. By September 19, 2022, filming had wrapped up, and the film was renamed to Darby and the Dead.

== Marketing ==
On November 3, 2022, a first-look image along with the film's logo was released, with the title confirmed as Darby and the Dead. The trailer was released on November 16, 2022. Writing for Tor.com, Molly Templeton called the film a pop culture blender, nodding to She's All That and Bring It On.

== Release ==
In March 2022, the film was scheduled to be released on Hulu. On November 3, 2022, it was announced that the film was released on December 2, 2022, on Hulu in the United States, and Disney+ internationally via the Star hub and Star+ in Latin America.

The film was removed from Hulu and Star on May 26, 2023.

== Reception ==
On the review aggregator website Rotten Tomatoes, 54% of 26 critics' reviews are positive, with an average rating of 5.2/10. The website's consensus reads, "Darby and the Dead's intriguing premise and appealing cast elevate it above standard teen comedy fare, even if the end result is often frustratingly shallow." Metacritic, which uses a weighted average, assigned the film a score of 51 out of 100, based on 7 critics, indicating "mixed or average" reviews.
