= Alleva Dairy =

American cheese shop in New York City

Coordinates: 40°43′10″N 73°59′50″W

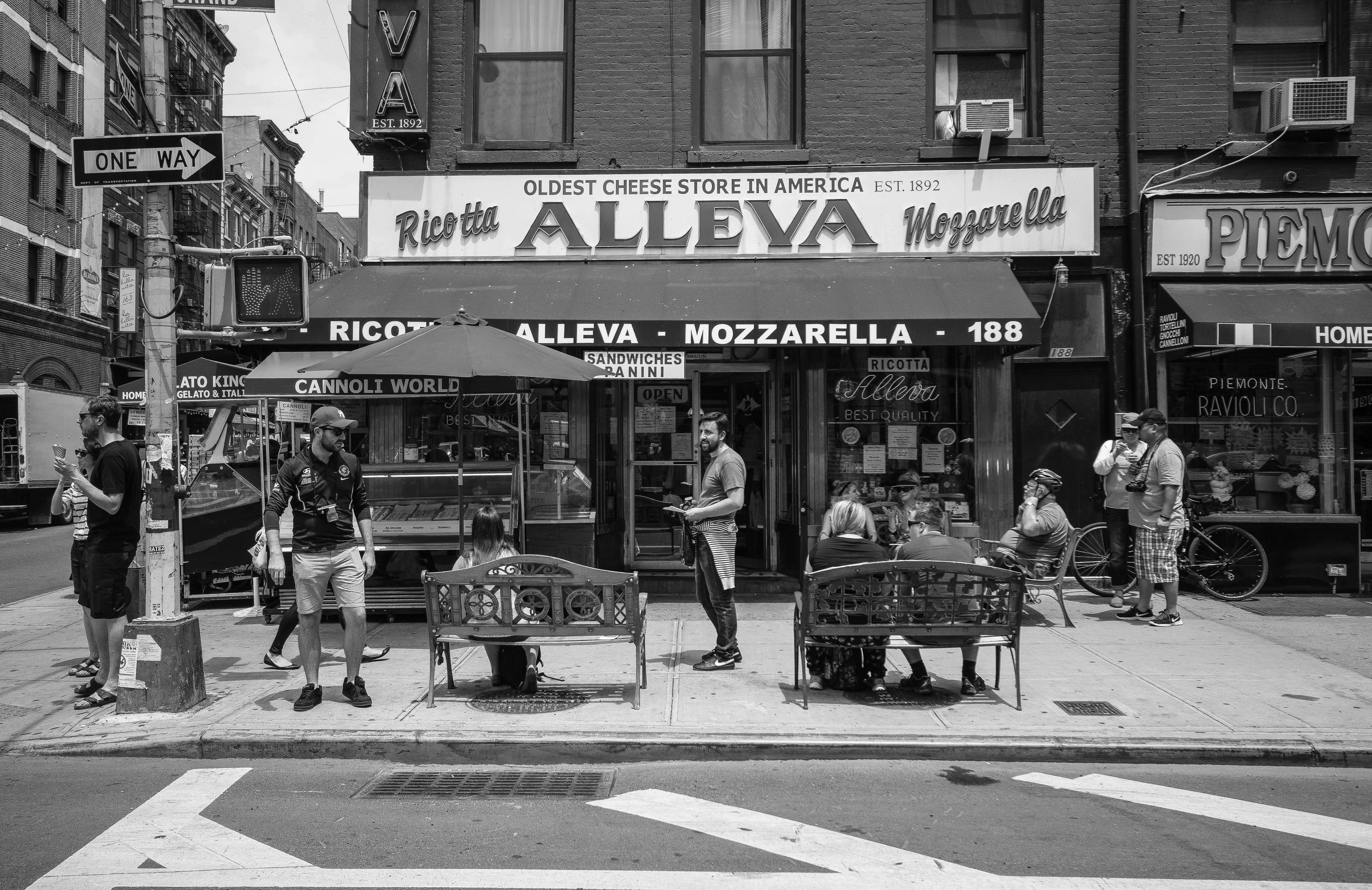
- The store's exterior in 2015
- Company type: Private
- Industry: Food industry
- Founded: 1892
- Founder: Pina Alleva
- Headquarters: Little Italy, Manhattan (original)
- Key people: Karen King (owner)
- Products: Cheese

Alleva Dairy, established in 1892 and located on Grand Street, in the Little Italy neighborhood of Manhattan, is the oldest cheese shop in the United States.

== Origins ==
The word Alleva derives from the Italian verb Allevare, which became a family surname perhaps due to its close connection with the raising of herding animals, such as cows or sheep. The store was founded by Pina Alleva from Benevento, Italy.

In 2014 the business was bought by the actor and onetime boxing manager John Ciarcia (aka Cha Cha and dubbed the unofficial mayor of Little Italy), a cousin of the Alleva family, and his wife Karen King. At one point Tony Danza, the actor, entertainer, and former boxer whom Cha Cha had once managed as a pugilist, was a partner in the shop.

In April 2022, it was reported that the store and its owner Karen King were more than $500,000 behind in rent because of the effects of the COVID-19 pandemic, leading to widespread coverage of the financial dilemma of the business and possible forthcoming closure.

On February 8, 2023, it was announced that the business would close the following month because of a disagreement with its landlord regarding unpaid rent. In September 2022, the store had applied for Chapter 11 bankruptcy, and its lease ended in October. The landlord agreed to forgo the overdue rent if the store paid a one-time sum of $31,000 and cleared out of the property by March 5, 2023. This brought to an end an occupancy that had lasted for more than 130 years.

At the time of the closure of its original Manhattan space, owner Karen King announced that Alleva Dairy would open at a new location on Polito Avenue in Lyndhurst, New Jersey.
