= Scottyite =

Barium copper silicate

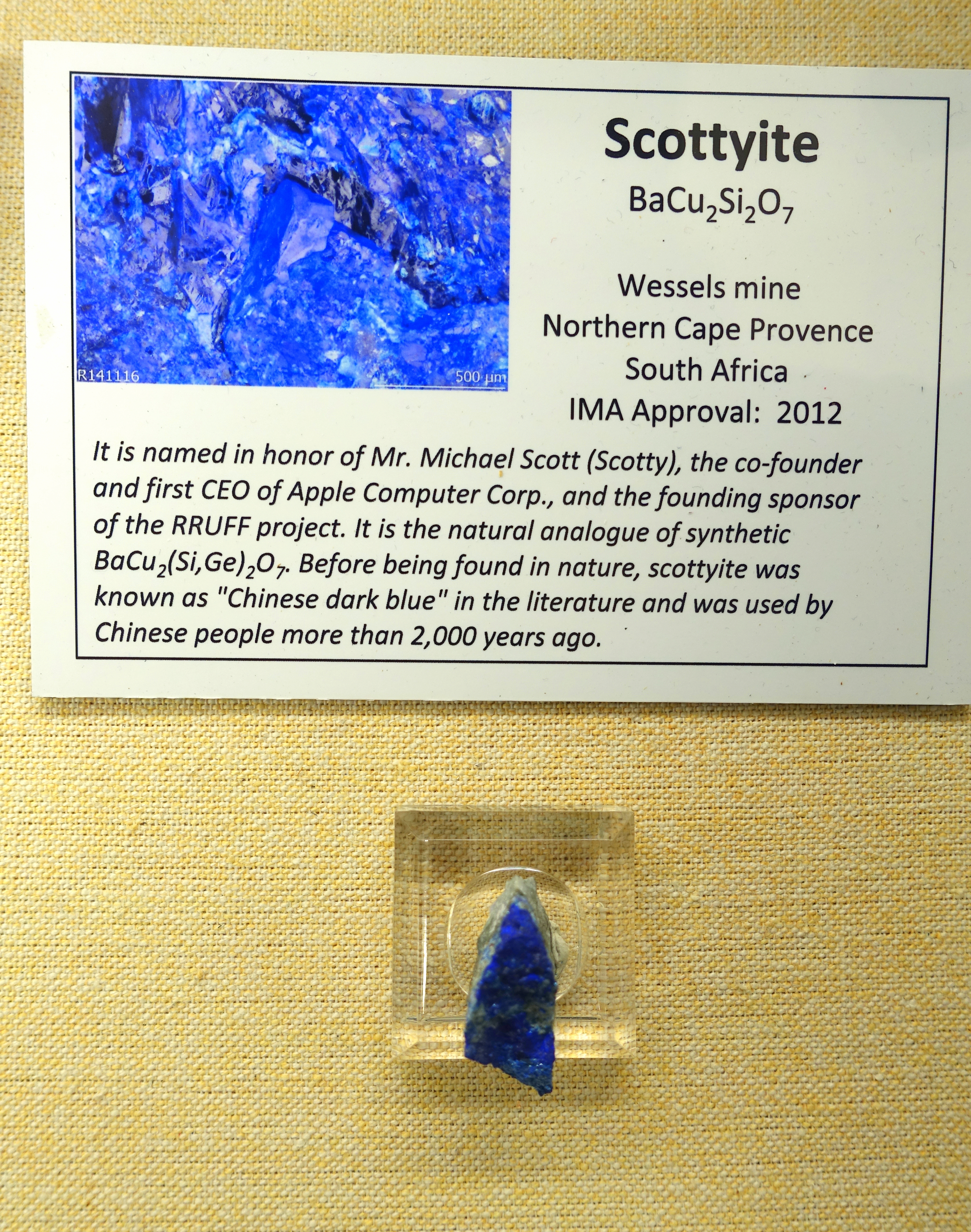

General
- Category: Minerals
- Formula: BaCu_{2}Si_{2}O_{7}
- IMA symbol: Sty
- Crystal system: Orthorhombic
- Crystal class: mmm (2/m 2/m 2/m) – Dipyramidal
- Space group: Pnma (no. 62)

Identification
- Colour: Dark-blue
- Cleavage: Perfect on {100} and {010}
- Tenacity: Brittle
- Mohs scale hardness: 4–5
- Luster: Vitreous
- Streak: Pale-blue
- Density: 4.654

Scottyite is a barium copper silicate. It was named for Michael Scott, first CEO of Apple. Its type locality is the Wessels mine, Northern Cape, South Africa, where it was first identified. It has also been found at several localities in the Rhineland-Palatinate.
