= The Tony Danza Show (2004 talk show) =

2004–2006 American TV talk show

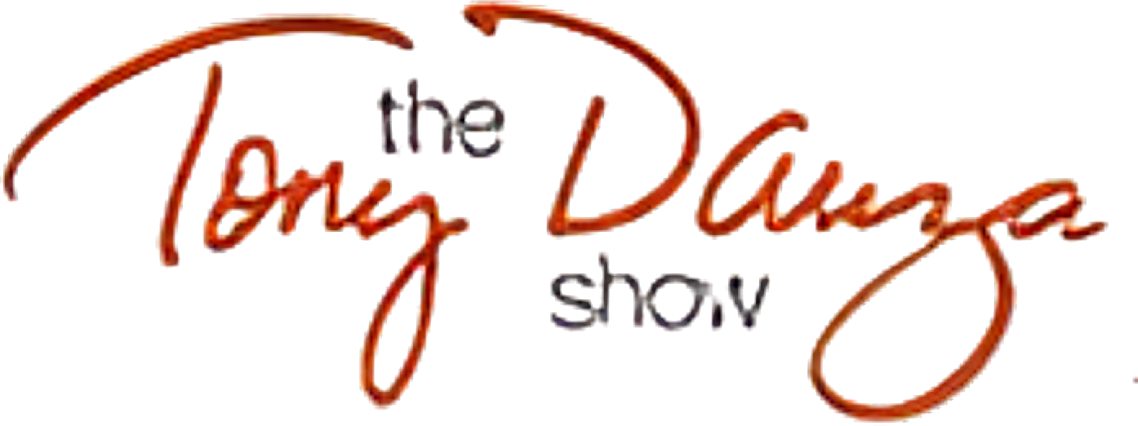
- Presented by: Tony Danza
- Starring: Ereka Vetrini; Nadia DiGiallonardo
- Country of origin: United States
- Original language: English
- No. of seasons: 2
- No. of episodes: 330

Production
- Executive producers: John Redmann; David Perler; Jill Blackstone
- Running time: 60 minutes
- Production companies: Katie Face Productions; Redmann Productions (season 1); Riverward Productions; Buena Vista Television

Original release
- Network: Syndicated
- Release: September 13, 2004 – May 26, 2006

The Tony Danza Show is a daytime variety talk show that premiered on September 13, 2004, in syndication and was distributed by Buena Vista Television. The show ran until May 26, 2006, and was recorded at the ABC studio complex on Manhattan's Upper West Side; like its sibling show, Live with Regis and Kelly, The Tony Danza Show was offered to Eastern Time Zone stations as a live show, with the stations choosing this option airing it at 10 AM Eastern.

The program was hosted by actor and New York native Tony Danza. For the first season Danza was joined by Ereka Vetrini as his co-host, with music provided by pianist Nadia DiGiallonardo. After the first season, Vetrini, who gained fame appearing on The Apprentice, was let go from the program, and DiGiallonardo took over most of her co-hosting duties.

On May 9, 2005, during a go-kart race with NASCAR Hall of Famer Rusty Wallace (who was a guest that day), Danza's kart flipped after Wallace accidentally bumped him. Danza suffered a concussion; neither he nor Wallace were wearing a helmet.

The most-viewed episode of the series featured the heavy metal band, The Tony Danza Tapdance Extravaganza, and their appearance followed an email from a viewer. The ratings, however, were not strong and in early March 2006, Danza told viewers that he was not sure if the program would return after a scheduled two-week hiatus. On March 24, 2006, the program returned with new episodes but after two more months The Tony Danza Show came to an end. The last live broadcast aired on May 26, 2006, with reruns continuing until September 15, 2006. VH1's The Best Week Ever then started an online petition to save the show.

== Extravadanza ==
"Extravadanza" was a game played once each day with a home viewer via telephone. Danza (or, more often, his co-host) would drop a chip on a Plinko-style board. Unlike Plinko, a stuck chip still counted when it eventually hit an amount. The caller would then try to answer a question, and similar to the games on Live with Regis and Kelly had 10 seconds and only one guess (as opposed to 20 seconds on "Live"). A correct answer won the dollar amount the chip landed on.
