= Teach: Tony Danza =

- Genre: Reality
- Starring: Tony Danza
- Country of origin: United States
- Original language: English
- No. of seasons: 1
- No. of episodes: 7

Production
- Production locations: Philadelphia, Pennsylvania, U.S.
- Running time: 45 minutes (excluding commercials)
- Production companies: The Greif Company; Thinkfactory Media

Original release
- Network: A&E
- Release: October 1 – November 5, 2010

Teach: Tony Danza is an American reality show about actor Tony Danza becoming a tenth-grade English teacher at Northeast High School in Philadelphia, Pennsylvania, during the 2009–2010 school year. The show premiered on October 1, 2010, on A&E. Filming took place predominantly during the first semester of the school year, with a few unaired scenes shot at the end of the second semester. Production was halted at the end of the first semester after the producers felt that the existing footage was not dramatic enough, and after Danza refused to allow the producers to try to generate drama among his students. The existing footage was used to create the seven episodes that aired. Tony continued to teach his class until the end of the school year and returned for a few years after the show aired as a commencement speaker at graduation.

== Episode list ==
No.	Title	Original release date	U.S. viewers (millions)
1	"Back to School"	October 1, 2010	0.937
Danza arrives at Northeast High School in Philadelphia. There he meets most of the faculty and his diverse class of students. He learns that teaching is harder than he thought when one of the students questions Danza's qualifications. He also attempts to bond with the students by becoming an assistant coach.
2	"Tested"	October 8, 2010	0.698
Danza fears that most of the student are not doing the work after half the class fails their first quiz. He also denies three of his "special needs" students the use of the resource room because he thinks they are being lazy. However, there may be legalities associated with this. To make matters worse, the brightest student in the class wants to drop out of the class because he isn't being challenged enough.
3	"Just Say No"	October 15, 2010	0.606
The Mayor of Philadelphia asks Danza to host a charity show. Danza talks one of his students out of quitting the football team, while trying to convince another student that school is worth the effort.
4	"Homesick"	October 22, 2010	0.560
Feeling homesick, Danza tries to plan a trip back home. However, he changes his plans after one of his students asks him to help in the band competition. Danza finds out he is not engaging his class enough and has to meet with one student's parents after catching the student not paying attention.
5	"Solidarity"	October 29, 2010	0.488
Danza and the rest of the faculty try to enforce the new school-wide uniform policy. After training some of his students to box, two of his students get into a fight. Another student disrespects the assistant principal by giving her a doggy treat.
6	"To Cheat or Not to Cheat"	November 5, 2010	0.534
Danza catches two students cheating on a test. In addition, Danza tries to mend a broken friendship between two girls in his class. Danza must deal with student issues when he chaperones the homecoming dance.
7	"Teacher's Pet"	November 5, 2010	0.534
Danza gives one student an extension on an essay, but refuses to allow another student a similar extension. As a result, the student tries to drop the class. Danza reaches out to a student who skips class. He also stages a charity show to raise money for a new air conditioner for the school's library.
