= Re-Election (film) =

- Directed by: Adam Saunders
- Written by: Adam Saunders
- Produced by: Adam Saunders; Mac Hendrickson; Erika Hampson
- Starring: Adam Saunders; Tony Danza; Bex Taylor-Klaus; Lane Factor; Nathalie Kelley; Patty Guggenheim; Kym Whitley; Rizwan Manji; William Ragsdale
- Production company: Footprint Features
- Distributed by: Picturehouse
- Release date: October 10, 2025
- Country: United States
- Language: English
- Box office: $19,222

Re-Election is a 2025 American comedy film starring Adam Saunders.

== Plot ==
Jimmy Bauer, a high school dropout who quit school after losing the election for senior class president to a classmate who went on to become the governor of Texas, is now working a dead-end job for his father, Stanislaw, and decides to return to his old alma mater to run for class president again in his forties.

== Film mission statement ==
Re-Election director and star Adam Saunders has said about the film, "In this deeply polarized political landscape, I wanted to make a fun, heartfelt, throwback political comedy — the kind of movie I loved growing up in Texas — that could be enjoyed by both sides of the political aisle. It’s a story about empathy, and personal responsibility, and how the stories we tell ourselves are the ones that shape our lives."

== Critical reception ==
Dallas Observer, "That tonal balance is perhaps Saunders’ greatest achievement in Re-Election. He distributes his weight as writer, producer, director and actor by fully committing to each in turn instead of halfheartedly committing to them all simultaneously. In front of the camera, he is only thinking about acting. Behind it, he is fully focused on directing his actors."

Houston Press, "What sounds like a broad comedy is actually something deeper — a story about personal agency and the lies we tell ourselves about fate."

On the review aggregator Rotten Tomatoes, the film holds an approval rating of 86% based on seven critics' reviews, six of which are positive.
