= Shimmer Lake =

2017 crime film by Oren Uziel

- Film poster
- Directed by: Oren Uziel
- Written by: Oren Uziel
- Produced by: Adam Saunders; Britton Rizzio
- Starring: Benjamin Walker; Wyatt Russell; Rainn Wilson; Adam Pally; Mark Rendall; John Michael Higgins; Ron Livingston; Stephanie Sigman; Rob Corddry
- Cinematography: Jarin Blaschke
- Edited by: Blake Maniquis
- Music by: Joseph Trapanese
- Production companies: Footprint Features; Writ Large
- Distributed by: Netflix
- Release date: June 9, 2017
- Running time: 83 minutes
- Countries: United States; Canada
- Language: English

Shimmer Lake is a 2017 American neo-noir crime film written and directed by Oren Uziel, in his directorial debut. The film stars Benjamin Walker, Wyatt Russell, Rainn Wilson, Adam Pally, Mark Rendall, John Michael Higgins, Ron Livingston, Stephanie Sigman, and Rob Corddry. The film was released on Netflix on June 9, 2017. Walker plays a small-town sheriff who investigates a bank robbery that involves his brother and two former friends. The story is told in reverse.

== Plot ==
On Friday, Andy Sikes cleans up in his basement, while his wife, Martha, speaks to his brother, sheriff Zeke Sikes above. When his young daughter, Sally, comes down to the basement, he silences her and makes her promise not to reveal his presence. Suspicious, Zeke investigates, but Andy escapes by stealing a neighbor's car. Zeke, revealed to have been shot during a bank robbery in which Andy participated, picks up his partner, Reed Ethington, and meets with FBI agents Kyle Walker and Kurt Biltmore. They investigate the house of judge Brad Dawkins, finding him dead. After an argument with the FBI agents over how to handle the investigation, Zeke steps out from his office. Meanwhile, Andy enters a forest to meet with Steph Burton, the wife of his accomplice, Ed Burton. He loads the bank's money in her car, but before he can get in, he is shot and killed by an unseen assailant, whose arm is bearing a tattoo: "State Champs".

On Thursday, Zeke and the other cops investigate meth addict Chris Morrow, who is believed to have been the getaway driver. They find him dead, and Zeke reveals that Andy, a former prosecutor, was widely rumored to have been corrupt after a questionable plea deal that got Ed and Chris off easy in the accidental death of Steph's and Ed's son in a meth lab explosion. Elsewhere, Judge Dawkins angrily demands that an incriminating tape being used to blackmail him be destroyed. At her house, Steph intentionally injures herself. When Zeke, Reed, and the FBI agents arrive at her house, she tells them that Ed assaulted her when she refused to leave with him. Under pressure, she admits he said something about leaving for Mexico. Dawkins meets with his teenage boyfriend, only to be surprised by Andy. Dawkins, desperate to protect his secret, attacks Andy but is killed. Andy flees back to his house and hides in the basement.

Wednesday, the day after the heist, Chris and Andy attempt to figure out what to do after Ed has seemingly double crossed them by taking the money for himself. Leaving Chris with instructions to stay hidden, Andy goes back into town to check on his brother, who he hears on the news has been shot by Ed. As Zeke meets the FBI agents, Chris gets a phone call from Steph, who invites him over to split the money. She begins undressing, seducing Chris, who is confused because he believes she would hate him for his part in the death of her son. Judge Dawkins bursts into the hotel room, anxious to retrieve the tape. Steph provokes Chris into attacking Dawkins, who kills him. With both the murder and the tape used to pressure him, Steph forces him to hold the money for Ed. At his house, Dawkins breaks down, crying, and tells his wife that he always intended to be a better husband to her.

Andy, Chris, and Ed (whose "State Champs" tattoo is revealed) plan the robbery on Tuesday despite Steph's attempts to talk them out of it. After an argument over Ed's involvement in their son's death, Ed says the heist is the only way for them to escape their current life. Dawkins, who owns the bank, reluctantly gives the safe's combination to Ed in return for Ed's promise to give him the tape. After loading the bank's vault with money, Dawkins thanks Zeke for personally watching it overnight. Before leaving, Dawkins suggests that Zeke kill anyone who attempts to rob it instead of arresting them. As Zeke reads a book, Ed and Andy break into the bank and take Zeke hostage. Once Ed has the situation under control, Andy leaves to watch the door and Ed opens the vault. Zeke wounds Ed with a gun hidden in the paper bag that holds his dinner and Steph and he reveal that they are the parents of the dead child, before killing Ed. It becomes clear Steph and Zeke, who has the same arm tattoo, planned to kill everyone responsible for their child's death. Zeke asks Steph to shoot him in the arm (which has been numbed). While Steph hides Ed's body at Shimmer Lake, Zeke begins his investigation.

== Cast ==
- Benjamin Walker as Zeke Sikes
- Rainn Wilson as Andy Sikes
- Stephanie Sigman as Steph Burton
- John Michael Higgins as Judge Brad Dawkins
- Mark Rendall as Chris Morrow
- Rob Corddry as Kurt Biltmore
- Ron Livingston as Kyle Walker
- Wyatt Russell as Ed Burton
- Adam Pally as Reed Ethington
- Matt Landry as Meth Billy
- Isabel Dove as Sally
- Neil Whitely as Harris
- Angela Vint as Martha Sikes
- Julie Khaner as Mrs. Allison Dawkins

== Production ==
Screenwriter Oren Uziel said that his script had been a spec script he wrote about one year before finishing up a similar spec script for God Particle (2018). The film serves as Uziel's directorial debut. Principal photography began on October 13, 2015.

== Release ==
On September 23, 2016, Netflix acquired distribution rights to the film. The film was released on Netflix on June 9, 2017.

== Reception ==
Rotten Tomatoes reported a 67% approval rating based on 9 reviews, with an average rating of 5.4/10.

Evan Jacobs, in his review for Movieweb, calls the film a "tour de force", and writes that the film, "from first time director Oren Uziel, is the kind of calling card that has been used to launch careers, like that of Quentin Tarantino." He later writes, "Shimmer Lake honestly belongs in the company of Pulp Fiction." Randall Colburn of Consequence of Sound wrote that the film's gimmick, being told in reverse, is not essential to the plot but enhances what he called "an otherwise-rote piece of pulp storytelling".

Variety listed Shimmer Lake as the standout 2017 contender for the Oscar for Best Original Screenplay.
