= Jobs (film) =

2013 American biographical drama film by Joshua Michael Stern

- Theatrical release poster
- Directed by: Joshua Michael Stern
- Written by: Matt Whiteley
- Produced by: Joshua Michael Stern; Mark Hulme
- Starring: Ashton Kutcher; Dermot Mulroney; Josh Gad; Lukas Haas; J.K. Simmons; Lesley Ann Warren; Ron Eldard; Ahna O'Reilly; John Getz; James Woods; Matthew Modine
- Cinematography: Russell Carpenter
- Edited by: Robert Komatsu
- Music by: John Debney
- Production companies: Five Star Feature Films; IF Entertainment; Venture Forth; Silver Reel; Endgame Entertainment
- Distributed by: Open Road Films
- Release dates: January 25, 2013 (Sundance Film Festival); August 16, 2013 (United States)
- Running time: 129 minutes
- Country: United States
- Language: English
- Budget: $12 million
- Box office: $42.1 million

Jobs is a 2013 American biographical drama film based on the life of Steve Jobs, from 1974 while a student at Reed College to the introduction of the iPod in 2001. It is directed by Joshua Michael Stern, written by Matt Whiteley, and produced by Stern and Mark Hulme. Steve Jobs is portrayed by Ashton Kutcher, with Josh Gad as Apple Computer's co-founder Steve Wozniak. Jobs was chosen to close the 2013 Sundance Film Festival.

== Plot ==
In Reed College, in 1974, the high tuition costs force Steve Jobs to drop out, but Dean Jack Dudman allows him to sit in on classes. Jobs is particularly interested in a calligraphy course. Influenced by Baba Ram Dass's book Be Here Now and their experiences with LSD, Jobs and his friend Daniel Kottke spend time in India. His philosophical ideas lead Jobs to the decision not to wear any footwear.

Two years later, Jobs is back in Los Altos, California, living with his adoptive parents Paul and Clara. While working for Atari, Inc. as a video game developer, Jobs develops a partnership with his friend Steve "Woz" Wozniak. Jobs is charged by his boss Al Alcorn to re-develop arcade video game Breakout, which he ends up having Wozniak build in his place. The job is such a success that Alcorn presents it to President Nolan Bushnell, but Jobs inequitably distributes the salary for Breakout's development between Wozniak and himself.

Later, Jobs discovers that Wozniak built a prototype for the Apple I, a "personal home computer" which he expresses interest in commercializing. They name their new company Apple Computer. After a failed sale at his employer company HP, Wozniak reluctantly demonstrates the Apple I at the Homebrew Computer Club to a bored audience. Jobs is later approached by store owner Paul Terrell who shows interest in the Apple I. Jobs persuades his father Paul to let them set up their new company in the family's garage workshop. Jobs also recruits Kottke, fellow engineer Bill Fernandez, and young neighbor Chris Espinosa to the Apple team.

Terrell's disappointment in the Apple I (in his opinion, being only a motherboard and not a full computer as promised), inspires Jobs to restart with a second model. He hires Rod Holt to re-conceptualize the power supply for what will be called the Apple II. Venture capitalist Mike Markkula notices Jobs and Wozniak's work, and also joins Apple. The Apple II is released at the 1977 West Coast Computer Faire, where it is a success.

Apple's success causes Jobs to distance himself from his friends. Upon learning that his high-school girlfriend Chrisann Brennan is pregnant, Jobs ends their relationship. Brennan gives birth to Lisa, whom Jobs denies is his child. Kottke (now an Apple II Plus repairer) meanwhile leaves the company after acknowledging that Jobs (who hardly even has any time to talk to him) is not rewarding the Apple I team with any Apple stock. John Sculley is recruited as CEO of the company. As Jobs' behavior grows more erratic, Jobs is moved from the Apple Lisa development team to the Macintosh Group, where he works with Bill Atkinson, Burrell Smith, Chris Espinosa, and Andy Hertzfeld. Despite the change, his behavior does not change: he forces out Jef Raskin, the original Macintosh group leader, and then takes his place. Later, he phones Microsoft founder Bill Gates, legally threatening him because their Word software is, in his opinion, a plagiarism of Apple's word processor. Wozniak, still part of the Apple IIe team, decides to leave the company, feeling that it has lost its way.

Though the Macintosh is introduced with great fanfare in 1984, including a high-budget commercial, it is seen as a failure due to the disproportionately high cost (as compared to IBM PC compatibles). Jobs, convinced that the error is the limited random-access memory of the system, launches a more advanced version, but Sculley forces him out of the company in 1985.

In 1996, Jobs is married to Laurene Powell and has accepted Lisa as his daughter (she now lives with them). He has a son, Reed, and also runs NeXT. When Apple buys NeXT, then-CEO Gil Amelio asks Jobs to return to Apple as a consultant. Jobs is named the new CEO, fires Amelio and relieves the Board of Directors. Jobs becomes interested in the work of Jony Ive, particularly during the design of the iMac and strives to reinvent Apple. Jobs later records the dialogue for the Think Different commercial in 1997. In 2001, Steve Jobs introduces the iPod at an Apple Town Hall meeting.

== Cast ==
=== Apple ===
- Ashton Kutcher as Steve Jobs
- Josh Gad as Steve Wozniak
- Lukas Haas as Daniel Kottke
- Victor Rasuk as Bill Fernandez
- Eddie Hassell as Chris Espinosa
- Ron Eldard as Rod Holt
- Nelson Franklin as Bill Atkinson
- Elden Henson as Andy Hertzfeld
- Lenny Jacobson as Burrell Smith
- Giles Matthey as Jony Ive
- Dermot Mulroney as Mike Markkula
- Matthew Modine as John Sculley
- J. K. Simmons as Arthur Rock
- Kevin Dunn as Gil Amelio
- Brett Gelman as Jef Raskin

=== Family ===
- John Getz as Paul Jobs
- Lesley Ann Warren as Clara Jobs
- Abby Brammell as Laurene Powell Jobs
- Annika Bertea as Lisa Brennan-Jobs (adult)
- Ava Acres as Lisa Brennan (child)
- Ahna O'Reilly as Chrisann Brennan

=== Other ===
- James Woods as John "Jack" Dudman
- David Denman as Al Alcorn
- Brad William Henke as Paul Terrell
- Robert Pine as Edgar S. Woolard Jr.
- Amanda Crew as Julie
- Masi Oka as Ken Tanaka

== Production ==
=== Development ===
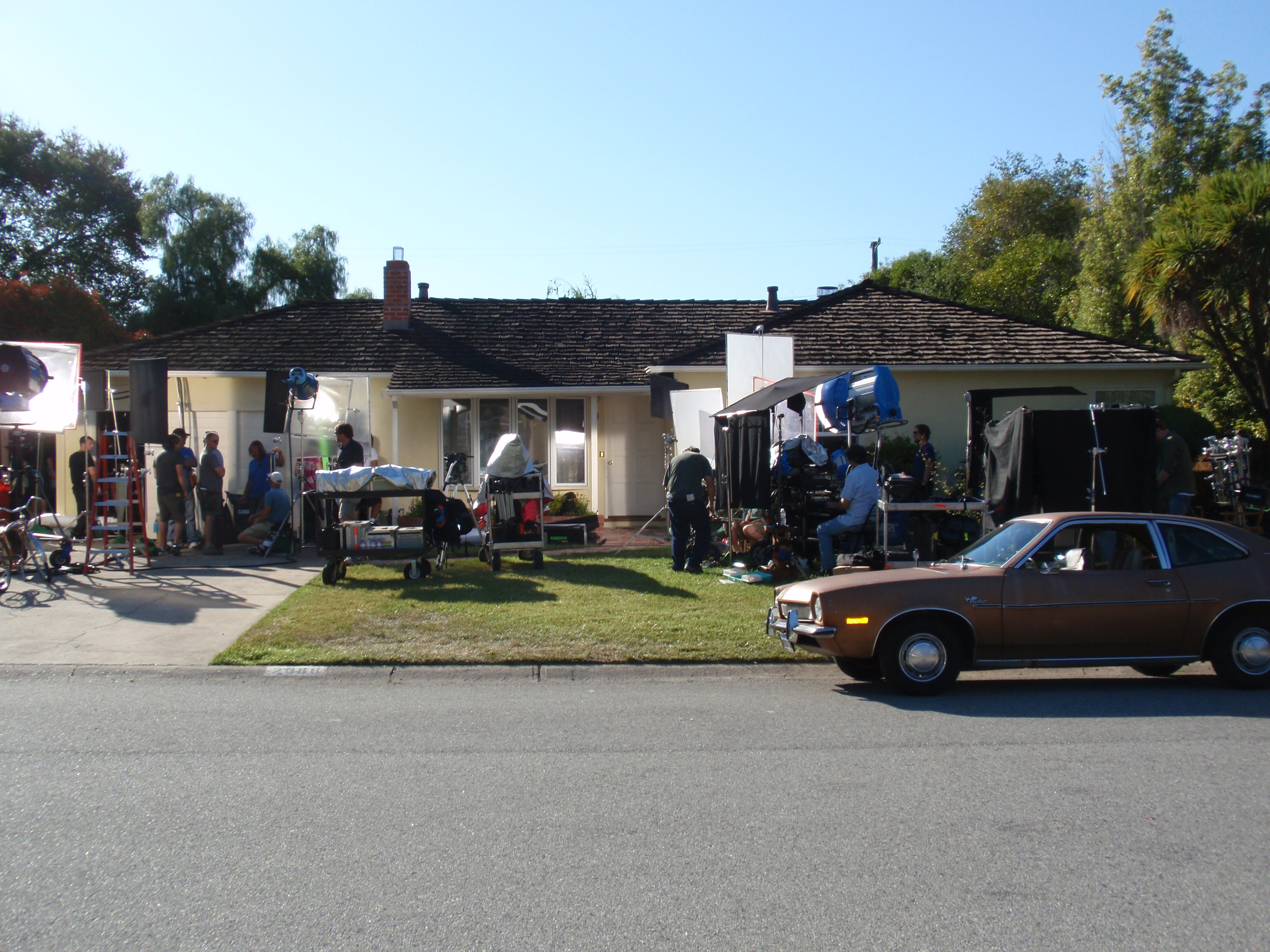
Crew filming Jobs at Steve Jobs' childhood home in Los Altos, California

Screenwriter Matt Whiteley began work on the screenplay around the time Steve Jobs took medical leave from Apple to battle pancreatic cancer. Director Joshua Michael Stern stated in an interview that all material for the screenplay was collected via research and interviews:

Mark Hulme, our producer, had an expert team of researchers to comb through all public records and interviews that had anything to do with Steve Jobs. Mark, the screenwriter and the research team, also took it upon themselves to interview quite a large pool of people who either worked at Apple or worked with Steve to make sure we portrayed as accurate a portrait and telling of the events possible within the constraints of the film's length.

=== Filming ===
Production began in June 2012 at Jobs' childhood home in Los Altos, California, with the help of Jobs' stepmother, Marilyn Jobs (who still lives there). It was also observed by his sister Patricia. The majority of the film was shot in the Los Angeles region. Russell Carpenter was the cinematographer.

In August 2012, production moved to New Delhi and Vrindavan in order to provide the setting for Jobs' 1974 trek to India. Locations include "Delhi's Jama Masjid, the Hauz Khas Complex, Safdarjung Tomb and Humayun's Tomb." Aseem Bajaj (Bandit Queen, Chameli, and Khoya Khoya Chand) served as cinematographer for scenes shot in India, though cinematographer Russell Carpenter went to India as well. Bajaj notes that they "shot guerrilla style in the crazy and mad by-lanes of Chandni Chowk in Old Delhi. We shot near the Red Fort and the famous Jama Masjid for two full days with multiple cameras spread across everywhere. Ashton stood frozen with the chaos staring right in his face which helped us capture what Steve Jobs must have felt on his visit to India."

== Release ==
The Business Insider described the film's opening as a box-office bomb, earning $6.7 million in its first weekend and placing seventh overall.

It had a worldwide gross of $42.1 million against its $12 million budget, making the film a modest box office success.

== Reception ==
On the review aggregator website Rotten Tomatoes, 27% of 131 critics' reviews are positive, with an average rating of 5.1/10. The website's consensus reads: "An ambitious but skin-deep portrait of an influential, complex figure, Jobs often has the feel of an over-sentimentalized made-for-TV biopic." Metacritic, which uses a weighted average, assigned the film a score of 44 out of 100, based on 35 critics, indicating "mixed or average" reviews. Audiences surveyed by CinemaScore gave the film an average grade of "B–" on an A+ to F scale.

E! Online said, "Critics have taken the film to task for a reach that falls far short of its ambition, marred by its superficial and unsatisfying portrait of an icon who deserved better." Forbes reported that the consensus among critics was "mixed positives for Kutcher's performance" and a "thumbs down for Joshua Michael Stern's film."

Robert X. Cringely, author of Accidental Empires and creator of the documentaries Triumph of the Nerds and Steve Jobs: The Lost Interview, argues that "the film is beautifully shot and Kutcher's portrayal of Jobs, while not spot-on, is pretty darned good. He certainly has the look down and the walk. But Ashton Kutcher also produced this film and he's definitely a better actor than producer. There are a lot of historical inaccuracies that just don't have to be there. ... The great failing of this film is the same failing as with Walter Isaacson's book: something happened during Steve's NeXT years (which occupy less than 60 seconds of this 122-minute film) that turned Jobs from a brat into a leader, but they don't bother to cover that." Mick LaSalle of the San Francisco Chronicle states that "at its best, it's a good picture, and at its worst, it's almost good." Peter Travers of Rolling Stone suggests that "Kutcher nails the genius and narcissism. It's a quietly dazzling performance" but also notes that "Jobs is a one-man show that needed to go for broke and doesn't. My guess is that Jobs would give it a swat."

Contributor for rogerebert.com, Susan Wloszczyna, gave the movie two out of four stars, saying that, "Rather than attempting a deeper plunge behind the whys and wherefores of the elite business-model gospel according to Apple Inc. guru Steve Jobs and – more importantly – what it says about our culture, the filmmakers follow the easy rise-fall-rise-again blueprint familiar to anyone who has seen an episode of VH1's Behind the Music." She further discusses how Kutcher's performance and the overall movie failed to portray Jobs in the iconic manner that current pop culture suggests even after Jobs' passing. In a movie review for The New York Times, writer Manohla Dargis writes that Jobs was "inevitably unsatisfying" and a result of a poor performance of the filmmakers rather than the actors themselves.

== Historical accuracy ==
In a January 2013 interview with The Verge, Steve Wozniak notes that he was approached by the crew of Jobs and given an early script to read. He read it as far as he "could stomach it and felt it was crap. The Sony people got in contact with me too and in the end I went with them. You can't do both [films] and be paid." At around the same time, he responded to the first promotional clip for the film on Gizmodo by stating that the "personalities are very wrong, although mine is closer ... our relationship was so different than what was portrayed."

In August 2013, before the wide release of the film, Kutcher responded to these critiques in a few interviews. In an interview with the Associated Press, Kutcher stated:

Steve Wozniak is being paid by another company to support their Steve Jobs film. It's personal for him, but it's also business. We have to keep that in mind. He was also extremely unavailable to us when producing this film. He's a brilliant man and I respect his work, but he wasn't available to us as a resource, so his account isn't going to be our account because we don't know exactly what it was. We did the best job we could. Nobody really knows what happened in the rooms.

He reiterated this point in an interview with The Hollywood Reporter by stating that Wozniak "is being paid by another movie studio to help support their Steve Jobs film, so he's gonna have an opinion that is connected to that, somewhat." Wozniak responded to Kutcher's comments as well as to the film itself on Gizmodo by stating that "either film would have paid me to consult, but the Jobs one already had a script written. I can't take that creative leadership from someone else. And I was turned off by the Jobs script. But I still hoped for a great movie." He also believed several individuals portrayed in the film were inaccurately or unfairly portrayed including himself and Steve Jobs. Wozniak reiterated these points in an interview with Bloomberg Television adding that he is "really easy to get a hold of, [Kutcher] could have called me and consulted over the phone any time." The Verge noted that "Wozniak was in fact invited to consult on the film, but declined after reading the script, saying he and his wife were 'abhorred' by it. Wozniak was a consultant on Aaron Sorkin's 2015 Steve Jobs film. When asked why he did not at least correct the inaccuracies he saw, Wozniak said, 'I have a very busy life, and it came at a very busy time in my life.'"

In an interview with Slashdot, Daniel Kottke states that he consulted on early versions of the screenplay and notes that "Ashton's very good. I have no complaints with him at all, no complaints with his portrayal of Jobs. The complaint that people would rightly have about the film is that it portrays Woz as not having the same vision as Steve Jobs, which is really unfair." He also said that the early versions of the screenplay "were painful. Really painful. I forwarded the first draft to Mike Markkula because they wanted his feedback, and Mike took such a bad reaction to it, he wouldn't have anything more to do with the project. By the time it got to the fourth draft, it was okay. It wasn't making me cringe." Kottke also outlines various areas that were both accurate and inaccurate in the film. Bill Fernandez was part of the same interview but states that he didn't see the film because "the whole thing is a work of fiction, and I don't want to be upset by all the things that the screenwriter has invented and don't represent the truth." Kottke responded that he didn't think of the film as fiction because "I was involved early on in the film, and they really, sincerely tried to make it as accurate as they could."

In the same interview, Fernandez and Kottke commented on the characterization of Rod Holt (portrayed by actor Ron Eldard). Kottke disputed the characterization, noting that: "What completely cracked us all up is the scene where Rod arrives for the first time. Rod comes up wearing leathers, riding up on a motorcycle with long hair ... he's like this motorcycle dude. It just cracked us all up." Fernandez, who had not seen the film at the time of the interview, was also surprised by this portrayal. Holt, however, (according to Kottke), "thought it was hilarious." As for why he may have been characterized this way, Kottke states that, "Rod was really into dirt bikes. And I never saw him riding one, but he talked about it all the time. So the author just had him riding up on a motorcycle. I liked that guy. I met him on the set. I had no idea who he was when I met him because he doesn't look at all like Rod, he has long straight hair and he's wearing leathers." Fernandez, who was equally amused by this vision of Holt responded by asking, "Who could this possibly be in the Apple universe? ... It seems to me that there's a lot of fan fiction about Apple Computer and about Steve Jobs, and I think that this is the biggest, flashiest piece of fan fiction that there's been to date."

Chris Espinosa stated on Twitter, "FYI My position at Apple precludes my commenting on the #JobsMovie with the press or public. But I can say that I enjoyed watching the film."

The TV show John Wants Answers took Wozniak, Kottke, and Andy Hertzfeld through the film scene by scene and discussed how the events actually occurred.

== Original soundtrack ==
A number of classic rock, classical music, and contemporary works appeared in the film. The commercial film soundtrack focuses on an original score by John Debney and includes some but not all of the classical and classic rock works.

No.	Title	Singers	Length
1.	"Peace Train" (1971)	Cat Stevens
2.	"Allegro from: Brandenburg Concerto No. 3, BWV 1048" (18th century)	Johann Sebastian Bach
3.	"The House of the Rising Sun" (1966)	The Brymers
4.	"Silver Ghost" (1970)	Parish Hall
5.	"Fantasie Impromptu in C-sharp minor, Op. posth. 66" (1834)	Frédéric Chopin
6.	"Boots of Spanish Leather" (1964)	Bob Dylan
7.	"Scarborough Fair"	Dylan McDonald & Cassidy Cooper / Produced by Mason Cooper & Jerry Deaton
8.	"There Were Times" (2013)	Freddy Monday
9.	"Sacrifice" (1960s)	The Brymers
10.	"Life's Been Good" (1978)	Joe Walsh
11.	"Roll with the Changes" (1978)	REO Speedwagon
12.	"Shine on Me"	Matthew Cheadle
13.	"Walk on the Ocean" (1992)	Toad the Wet Sprocket
14.	"You Can Do (Whatever)" (2013)	Yusuf Islam

== See also ==
- List of depictions of Steve Jobs
