= Dotty & Soul =

Comedy film by Adam Saunders

- Film poster
- Directed by: Adam Saunders
- Written by: Adam Saunders
- Produced by: Adam Saunders; Avril Z. Speaks
- Starring: Leslie Uggams; Adam Saunders; David Koechner; Gary Owen
- Cinematography: Jay Visit
- Edited by: Peter CabadaHagan
- Music by: Kathryn Bostic
- Production companies: Footprint Features, Azuspeak Productions
- Distributed by: Quiver Distribution
- Release date: October 21, 2022
- Running time: 110 minutes
- Country: United States
- Language: English

Dotty & Soul is a 2022 American comedy film written and directed by Adam Saunders in his directorial debut. The Paramount+ with Showtime film stars Leslie Uggams, Saunders, David Koechner and Gary Owen. The film follows Ethan Cox (Saunders), the owner of a self-driving car company, who finds himself cancelled when his controversial Halloween costume grabs the attention of the public on social media and puts his career at risk. To mitigate the damage, he hires Dotty (Uggams), a 71-year-old snack cart vendor, as the company's new CEO.

The film premiered at the 2022 San Diego International Film Festival in October 2022. It was released on May 19, 2023, by Quiver Distribution.

== Cast ==
- Leslie Uggams as Dotty
- Adam Saunders as Ethan Cox
- David Koechner as Brannigan
- Gary Owen as Diggy
- M. Emmet Walsh as Harold Eichelbaum
- Bobby Naderi as Farhad Ghorbani
- Alexis Ren as Stefani
- Margot Bingham as Isabella
- Tina Parker as Dora

== Reception ==
On the review aggregator website Rotten Tomatoes, 40% of 5 critics' reviews are positive, with an average rating of 5.1/10.

Brittany Witherspoon from the Screen Rant gave the film a positive review, writing "The story and characters progress naturally, and the good film comes down to its execution by the cast and crew...To the surprise of no one, Deadpool’s Leslie Uggams is tremendous as Dotty and delivers a show stopping performance...Saunders feature length directorial debut is a confident one.”

Film critic Avi Offer from the NYC Movie Guru in a mixed review, writes: "Dotty & Soul has two things going for it... First, there's Leslie Uggams' charismatic performance. The film comes alive the most whenever she's on screen. She deserves better material, though. "
