= Chris Espinosa =

American software engineer (born 1961)

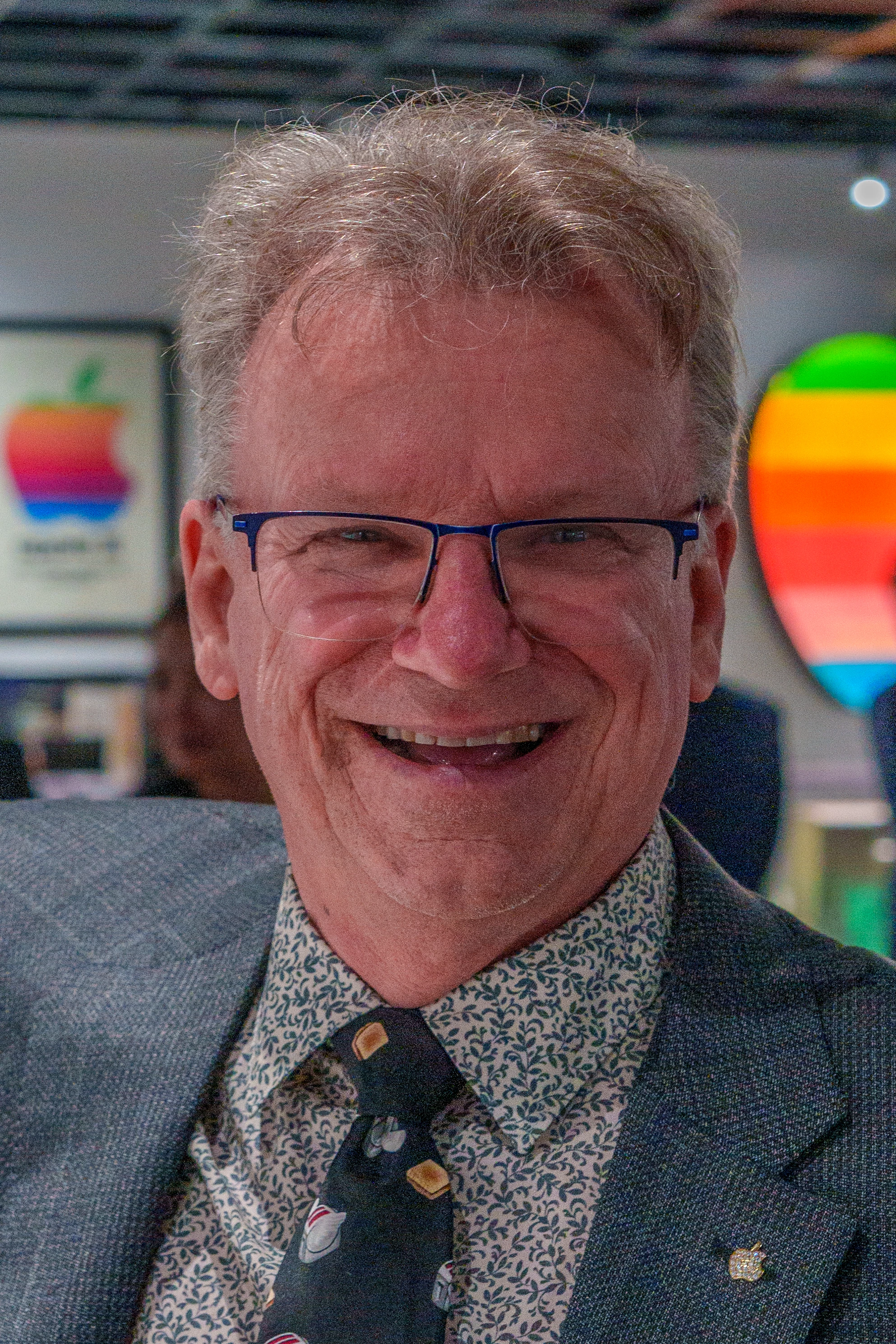
- Espinosa in 2026
- Born: Christopher Espinosa; September 18, 1961 (age 64)
- Education: University of California, Berkeley
- Occupations: Engineer, Inventor
- Known for: Longest-serving Apple employee

Christopher Espinosa (/ˌɛspɪˈnoʊzə/; born September 18, 1961) is an American software engineer. He is a senior employee of Apple Inc., officially employee number 8; he joined the company at the age of fourteen in 1976 when it was still housed in Steve Jobs' parents' garage, writing software manuals and coding after school. As of 2026, he is the company's current and all-time longest-serving employee.

== Career ==
Espinosa met Steve Jobs at Paul Terrell's Byte Shop while Jobs was installing an Apple I, and later befriended Steve Wozniak. Espinosa had been warned against the two by his teachers at Homestead High School, where they had also been students.

In 1976, the 14-year-old Espinosa became employee number eight at Apple, as one of the youngest employees. He began writing BASIC programs in Jobs's garage. He and other early employees slept underneath their desks. He has worked his entire life at Apple, with the exception of a brief hiatus during which he studied at the University of California, Berkeley, where his freshman advisor was graduate student Andy Hertzfeld, who along with Barney Stone had started a local Apple user group.

In 1981, Jobs convinced Espinosa to drop out of Berkeley to work in Apple's publications department. Although Espinosa had not participated in the company's 1980 initial public offering, Wozniak had offered up to 2,000 pre-IPO shares at US$5 a share to each of a group of 40 employees that he thought were undervalued (including Espinosa); this became known as the WozPlan.

Espinosa has worked in a variety of positions and departments at Apple. He has contributed to the classic Mac OS, A/UX, HyperCard, Taligent and Kaleida Labs (as project manager in the AIM alliance), AppleScript, Xcode, macOS, and the iOS Family Sharing system. He is a frequent speaker at Apple's Worldwide Developers Conference and occasionally appears as a panelist at its Stump the Experts session.

== In media ==
Actor Eddie Hassell portrayed Espinosa in the 2013 film Jobs.

== See also ==
- Outline of Apple Inc. (personnel)
- History of Apple Inc.
- Calculator (Apple)
