= Riele Downs =

Canadian-American actress (born 2001)

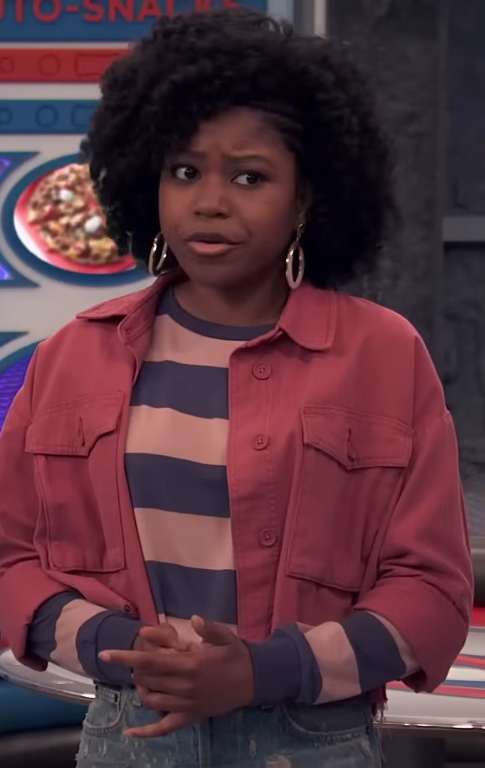
- Downs playing Charlotte Page in Henry Danger
- Born: July 8, 2001 (age 25); Ontario, Canada
- Citizenship: Canada; United States
- Occupation: Actress
- Years active: 2005–present

Riele Downs (born July 8, 2001) is a Canadian and American actress. She began her career as a child actress, playing Faith in the 2013 film The Best Man Holiday. She went on to co-star as Charlotte on the Nickelodeon television series Henry Danger from 2014 to 2020.

== Early life and career ==
Downs was born on July 8, 2001. She has indicated that she has "some experience with dancing".

Downs started acting when she was 3 years old and got her first role in the 2005 film Four Brothers, playing Amelia Mercer. She appeared in A Russell Peters Christmas Special in 2013. The same year, Downs played Faith Sullivan in the 2013 comedy-drama film The Best Man Holiday. In 2022, she appeared in the television films Fir Crazy and The Gabby Douglas Story.

In 2014, Downs was cast in her first starring role on the Nickelodeon television series Henry Danger, playing Charlotte, the best friend of the titular character. In 2017, she co-starred in the supernatural teen comedy film Darby and the Dead.

In 2024, Downs was cast as Carlesha Gaither in the Lifetime film Abducted Off the Streets: The Carlesha Gaither Story, as part of its "Ripped from the Headlines" series based on the kidnapping of Carlesha Gaither.

== Filmography ==
=== Film ===
Year	Title	Role	Notes
2005	Four Brothers	Amelia Mercer	
2013	The Best Man Holiday	Faith	
2014	Ruby Skye P.I.: The Maltese Puppy	Kat	
2022	Darby and the Dead	Darby Harper	
2025	A Breed Apart	Queen	
TBA	Dreams of the Moon	Lucy	Post-production

=== Television ===
Year	Title	Role	Notes
2008	ReGenesis	Young Jamila Thompson	Episode: "Bloodless"
2009	'Da Kink in My Hair	Shawnee	Episode: "Forced Ripe Mango"
2010	Rookie Blue	Little Girl	Episode: "Fresh Paint"
2010	Made... The Movie	Karinna	Television film
2010	Peep and the Big Wide World	Baby Ant / Bunny 2 / Bunny 5	Voice role; 2 episodes
2014	The Gabby Douglas Story	Arielle	Television film
2014–2020	Henry Danger	Charlotte	Main role
2015	Nickelodeon's Ho Ho Holiday Special	Sheila	Television special
2017	Nickelodeon's Not So Valentine Special	Riele/Vanessa	Television special
2017	Nickelodeon's Sizzling Summer Camp Special	Dale	Television special
2017	Tiny Christmas	Emma	Television film
2018	The Adventures of Kid Danger	Charlotte	Main voice role
2019	All That	Herself	Episode 1105
2023	Bel-Air	Yazmin Staats	Recurring role, 5 episodes
2024	Abducted Off the Streets: The Carlesha Gaither Story	Carlesha Gaither	Television film
2025	My Life with the Walter Boys	Maria	3 episodes

== Awards and nominations ==
Year	Award	Category	Work	Result	Refs
2020	Kids' Choice Awards	Favorite Female TV Star	Henry Danger	Nominated	
