= Michael Scott (Apple) =

American entrepreneur

- Born: February 11, 1945
- Died: April 12, 2025
- Known for: CEO of Apple Computer, Inc.

Michael "Scotty" Scott (February 11, 1945 – April 12, 2025) was an American entrepreneur, who was the first CEO of Apple Computer, Inc from February 1977 to March 1981. Formerly director of manufacturing at National Semiconductor, Scott was persuaded by Mike Markkula to take the CEO position at Apple, as the co-founders — Steve Jobs and Steve Wozniak — were both seen as insufficiently experienced for the job at the time.

== Career ==
After graduating from the California Institute of Technology, Scott worked at Fairchild Semiconductor, where he shared a cubicle with Mike Markkula and Gene Carter; all 3 would later end up working together at Apple.

=== Apple ===
Attempting to set an example for all businesses, in 1979, Scott declared there would be no typewriters at Apple. In 1979 and 1980, Jef Raskin's Macintosh project was a four-person research effort. It was not considered important within Apple and was almost canceled a couple of times. When Apple had another major reorganization in the fall of 1980, it was terminated again, but Raskin pleaded with Scott and Markkula for more time and was granted three more months to show that he was really onto something.

On February 25, 1981, the day known as "Black Wednesday" at the company, Scott personally fired forty Apple employees, including half of the Apple II team, in a belief that they were redundant. Later in the afternoon he assembled the remaining employees with a keg of beer and explained the firings by stating, "I used to say that when being CEO at Apple wasn't fun anymore, I'd quit. But now I've changed my mind — when it isn't fun any more, I'll fire people until it's fun again."

Following this abrupt event, he was moved to vice chairman, a title with little power, and Markkula, the man who had hired Scott, replaced him.

Scott left Apple officially on July 10, 1981, stating in his resignation letter:

So I am having a new learning experience, something I've never done before. I quit, not resign to join a new company or retire for personal reasons ... This is not done for those who fear my opinions and style, but for the loyal ones who may be given false hope.
Yours. Michael, Private Citizen

=== Later career ===
From 1983 to 1988, Scott led Starstruck, a private firm that attempted to create a sea-based satellite-launching rocket. He also began supporting non-profit organizations, such as the Seattle Opera and the California Institute of Technology in their efforts to apply personal computers to their needs.

=== Gemstone expert ===
Scott later became an expert on colored gemstones, having written a book on them and assembled a collection that has been exhibited at the Bowers Museum in Santa Ana, California. He also sponsored Rruff, a project creating a complete set of high-quality spectral data from well-characterized minerals. The mineral rruffite (IMA 2009-077) was named for the Rruff project and the mineral scottyite (IMA 2012-027) for Michael Scott.

== Sources ==
- Linzmayer, Owen W (January 2004). Apple Confidential 2.0: The Definitive History of the World's Most Colorful Company (2nd ed.). San Francisco: No Starch Press. p. 344. ISBN 1-59327-010-0. OCLC 52821221.

Preceded by Company founded	Apple CEO; 1977–1981	Succeeded by Mike Markkula
