= Mike Markkula =

American businessman (born 1942)

- Born: Armas Clifford Markkula Jr. February 11, 1942 (age 84); Los Angeles, California, U.S.
- Education: University of Southern California (BS, MS)
- Known for: Chairman of Apple Computer, Inc.

Armas Clifford "Mike" Markkula Jr. (/mɑːrˈkuːlə/; born February 11, 1942) is an American electrical engineer, businessman and investor. He was the original angel investor, long-time chairman, and briefly CEO for Apple Computer, Inc., providing critical early funding and managerial support. At the company's incorporation, Markkula owned 26% of Apple, equivalent to each of the shares owned by cofounders Steve Jobs and Steve Wozniak.

== Early life ==
Markkula's great-grandfather, Isak Ferdinand Markkula, was born in Sievi, Finland. He and his wife moved to the United States in either 1865 or 1883, depending on the source. Mike Markkula's first name Armas and last name Markkula are traditional Finnish names. His first name Armas means "dear" or "beloved" in the Finnish language.

Markkula earned bachelor's and master's degrees in electrical engineering from the University of Southern California.

== Career ==
Markkula made millions from stock options he earned as a marketing manager for Fairchild Semiconductor and Intel, reaching financial independence and early retirement at 33. After that, he became a startup consultant and mentored dozens of entrepreneurs, working only every Monday.

=== Apple ===
Markkula was introduced by Regis McKenna and venture capitalist Don Valentine to Steve Jobs and Steve Wozniak while they were looking for funding to manufacture the Apple II personal computer they had developed after having sold some units of their first computer, the Apple I. Jobs and Wozniak had previously gone to McKenna and then Valentine, but neither was originally interested in the Apple pair; after meeting with the young and unkempt Jobs, Valentine asked McKenna, "Why did you send me this renegade from the human race?" However, Valentine forwarded their information to Markkula, who proved interested, and came out of retirement to personally work on the opportunity.

With his guidance and funding, Apple ceased to be a partnership between Jobs and Wozniak, and was incorporated as a company on January 3, 1977. Markkula provided Apple with funding of $80,000 - $92,000 personally in addition to securing a $170,000 – $250,000 line of credit from Bank of America. He brought in his friend and former coworker Michael Scott as the first president and CEO, then replaced Scott with himself from 1981 to 1983 despite having originally promised his wife that he would only stay at Apple for four years, and then later planning to retire again by 1984; during the board meeting to confirm him as the CEO, Markkula received a phone call that his father-in-law and best friend had died.

Markkula served as Apple's chairman of the board from 1985 to 1997, except during the period he served as CEO, and a brief time in 1996. In 1996 Fortune described him as "the reclusive chairman who has always been the real power at Apple". As chairman Markkula approved Jef Raskin's 1979 plan to start designing what would become the Macintosh, then prevented Jobs from killing the project in favor of his own Lisa. In 1985, Markkula took John Sculley's side in a dispute with Jobs, causing the latter to leave the company; he would later help to force Sculley out in 1993. Fortune wrote "Apple CEOs have two things in common: They all get into big trouble; and Markkula always sorts out the mess".

In addition to providing what The New York Times later described as "adult supervision" to the younger Jobs and Wozniak, as a trained engineer Markkula also possessed technical skills. Michael Tomczyk recalled being surprised by the technical sophistication of a software question Markkula asked Wozniak. He wrote several early Apple II programs, served as a beta tester for Apple hardware and software, and wrote one of the first three programs available for the unsuccessful Apple III. Wozniak was motivated to design the Disk II floppy disk drive system after Markkula found that a checkbook-balancing program he had written loaded too slowly from a data cassette. Markkula retired from Apple after Jobs returned as interim CEO in 1996. He supported Jobs' 1997 return and agreed to step down from Apple's board.

Wozniak, who designed the first two Apple computers, credits Markkula for the success of Apple more than himself.

Jeffrey Nordling portrayed him in the 1999 TNT film Pirates of Silicon Valley. Dermot Mulroney later portrayed him in the 2013 film Jobs.

=== Other ventures and philanthropy ===
Outside Apple, Markkula founded Echelon Corporation, ACM Aviation, the San Jose Jet Center and Rana Creek Habitat Restoration. He and his wife, Linda, also provided the initial funding for the Markkula Center for Applied Ethics at Santa Clara University and, in the mid-1990s, established its endowment with a $5 million gift. Markkula served as chairman of Santa Clara University's board of trustees from 2003 to 2009.

Markkula was an investor in Crowd Technologies, a startup developing a web application called Piqqem that applies the wisdom of crowds to stock market predictions. He is an investor in Scotland-based LiveCode Ltd.

Markkula owned the Rana Creek Ranch from 1982 to 2023. In July 2023, he sold his 14,000-acre Rana Creek Ranch in Carmel Valley (Monterey County) to The Wildlands Conservancy for $35 million.

| Preceded by Michael Scott | Apple CEO; 1981–1983 | Succeeded by John Sculley |
| Preceded by New title | Apple Chairman; 1977–1981 | Succeeded by Steve Jobs |
| Preceded by Steve Jobs | Apple Chairman; 1985–1993 | Succeeded by John Sculley |
| Preceded by John Sculley | Apple Chairman; 1993–1996 | Succeeded by Gil Amelio |
