= Bill Fernandez =

American computer designer

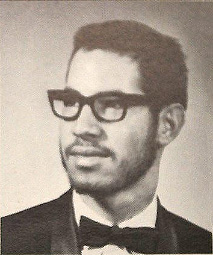
- Education: Homestead High School
- Occupation: Engineer
- Known for: Apple Inc. employee #4 who first introduced Steve Jobs and Steve Wozniak; a member of the Apple Macintosh development team

Bill Fernandez is an American software engineer, user-interface architect, and innovator who was Apple Computer's first full time employee when they incorporated in 1977 and was issued badge number 4. He is credited with introducing fellow Homestead High School student Steve Jobs to his friend (and Homestead alumnus) Steve Wozniak and developing schematics for the Apple II so the computer could be mass-produced.

He is the son of Jerry Fernandez and Bambi Fernandez (both Stanford University graduates).

== Career at Apple ==
Fernandez worked on the Cream Soda Computer with Steve Wozniak in 1971, the first computer designed by Wozniak and built using spare parts from Wozniak's job. He later joined Apple and worked on both the Apple I and Apple II personal computers. In the 1980s, he became a member of the Apple Macintosh development team. He contributed to several user interface aspects of the classic Mac OS, QuickTime and HyperCard and owns a user interface patent granted in 1994. He was laid off from Apple in 1993.

== Popular culture ==
- Fernandez appeared in the 2011 documentary about Apple, One Last Thing.
- Fernandez is portrayed by the actor Victor Rasuk in the 2013 film Jobs.
