= Tony Danza =

American boxer and actor (born 1951)

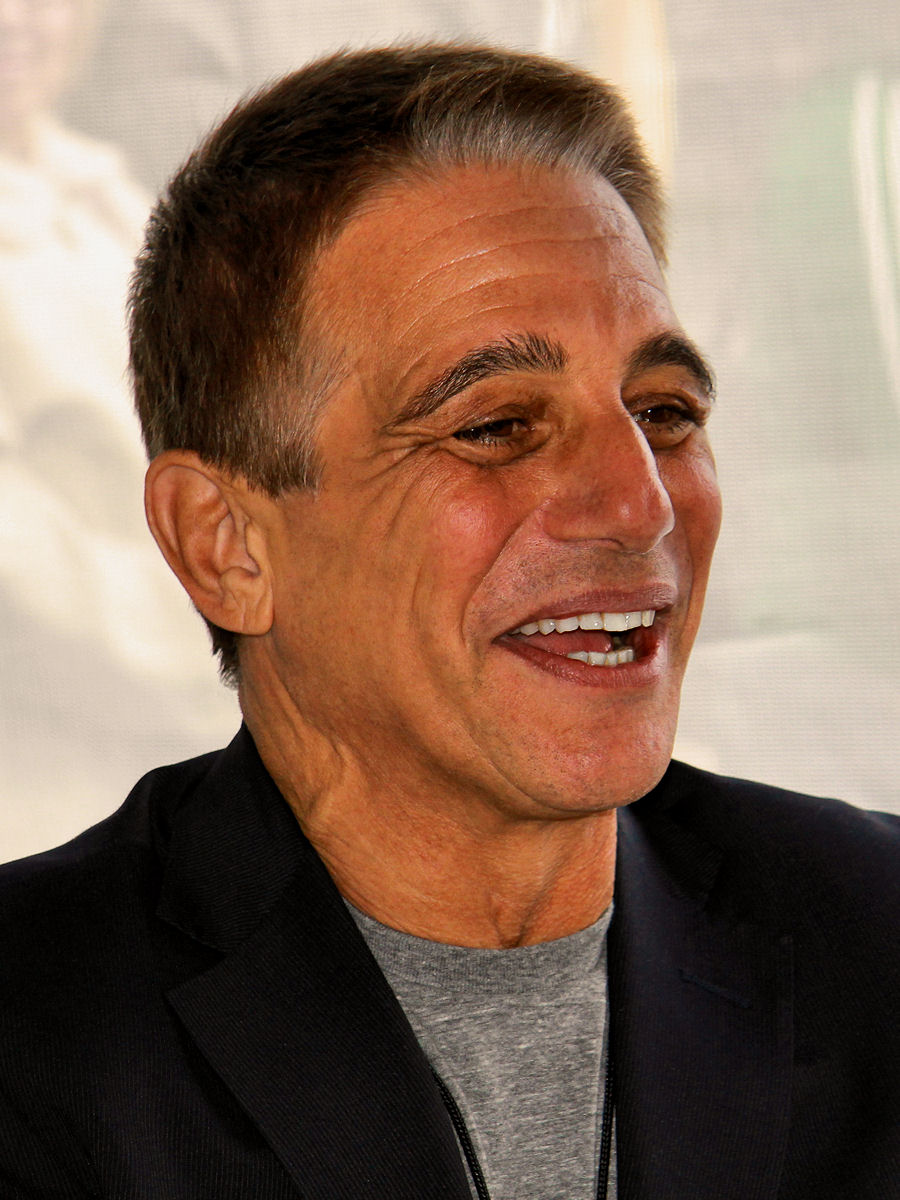
- Danza in 2012
- Born: Anthony Salvatore Iadanza; April 21, 1951 (age 75); New York City, New York, U.S.
- Education: University of Dubuque (BA)
- Occupation: Actor
- Years active: 1978–present
- Height: 5 ft 9 in (175 cm)
- Spouses: Rhonda Yeoman (m. 1970; div. 1974); Tracy Robinson (m. 1986; div. 2013)
- Children: 4

Tony Danza (born Anthony Salvatore Iadanza; April 21, 1951) is an American actor and retired professional boxer. He is known for co-starring in the television series Taxi (1978–1983) and Who's the Boss? (1984–1992), for which he was nominated for an Emmy Award and four Golden Globe Awards. In 1998, Danza won the People's Choice Award for Favorite Male Performer in a New Television Series for his work on the 1997 sitcom The Tony Danza Show (not to be confused with his 2004–2006 daytime variety talk show of the same name). He has also appeared in films such as The Hollywood Knights (1980), Going Ape! (1981), Cannonball Run II (1984), She's Out of Control (1989), Angels in the Outfield (1994), Crash (2004), and Don Jon (2013).

== Early life ==
Danza was born on April 21, 1951, in Brooklyn, New York, to parents Anna Mary (née Camisa; 1925–1993) and Matthew Anthony "Matty" Iadanza (1920–1983). His mother was a bookkeeper and his father worked as a waste collector in Brooklyn. Danza's paternal grandparents were from Pietrelcina, Benevento, Campania, Italy, and his mother was an immigrant from the town of Campobello di Mazara in the Sicilian province of Trapani. He has a younger brother, Matty Jr. (born 1954), a Los Angeles restaurant owner. He lived in East New York, Brooklyn until he was 14, and his family relocated to Malverne, New York, on Long Island. Danza attended Malverne Senior High School, graduating in 1968. In the first episode of his show Teach: Tony Danza, Danza describes himself as a "bad student" in high school. He earned a bachelor's degree in history in 1972 from the University of Dubuque, which he attended on a wrestling scholarship. In 1975, as a joke, Danza's friends entered him in the New York City Golden Gloves Tournament. After knocking out his first six opponents all in the first round, Danza was knocked out in the finals.

During his first year of college, he had the Robert Crumb "Keep on Truckin'" character tattooed on his upper right arm. In a 1985 interview in Us Weekly magazine, Danza remarked, "I was playing pool with a guy who had all these tattoos, and I wanted to be friends." Danza also sports a "Keep Punching" boxing gloves tattoo on his right shoulder as well as "Tracy", his (former) wife's name, on his chest. In college, Danza met and married his first wife.

== Career ==
=== Boxing ===
Danza was a professional boxer with a record of 8 wins and 3 losses (8 knockouts, 6 in the first round). He competed from 1976 until 1979 in the middleweight division.

=== Acting and show business ===
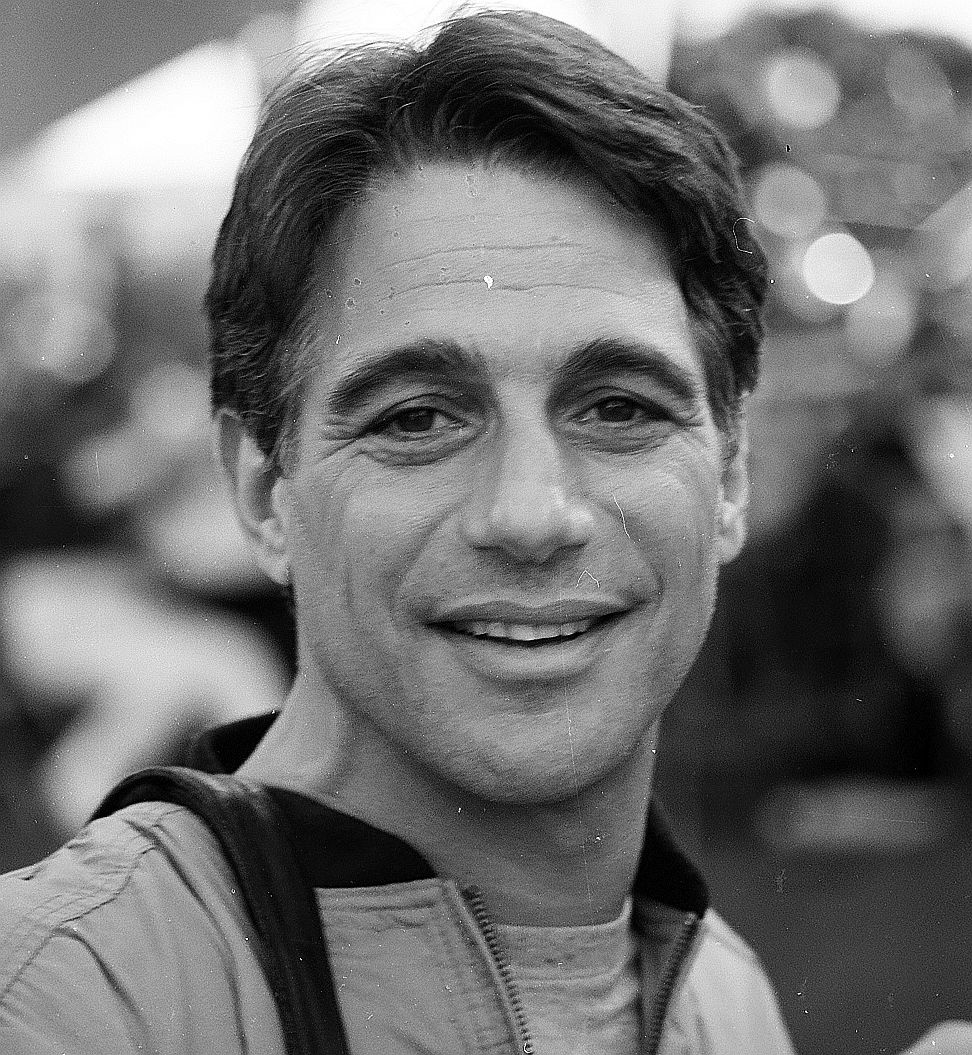
Danza in 1995

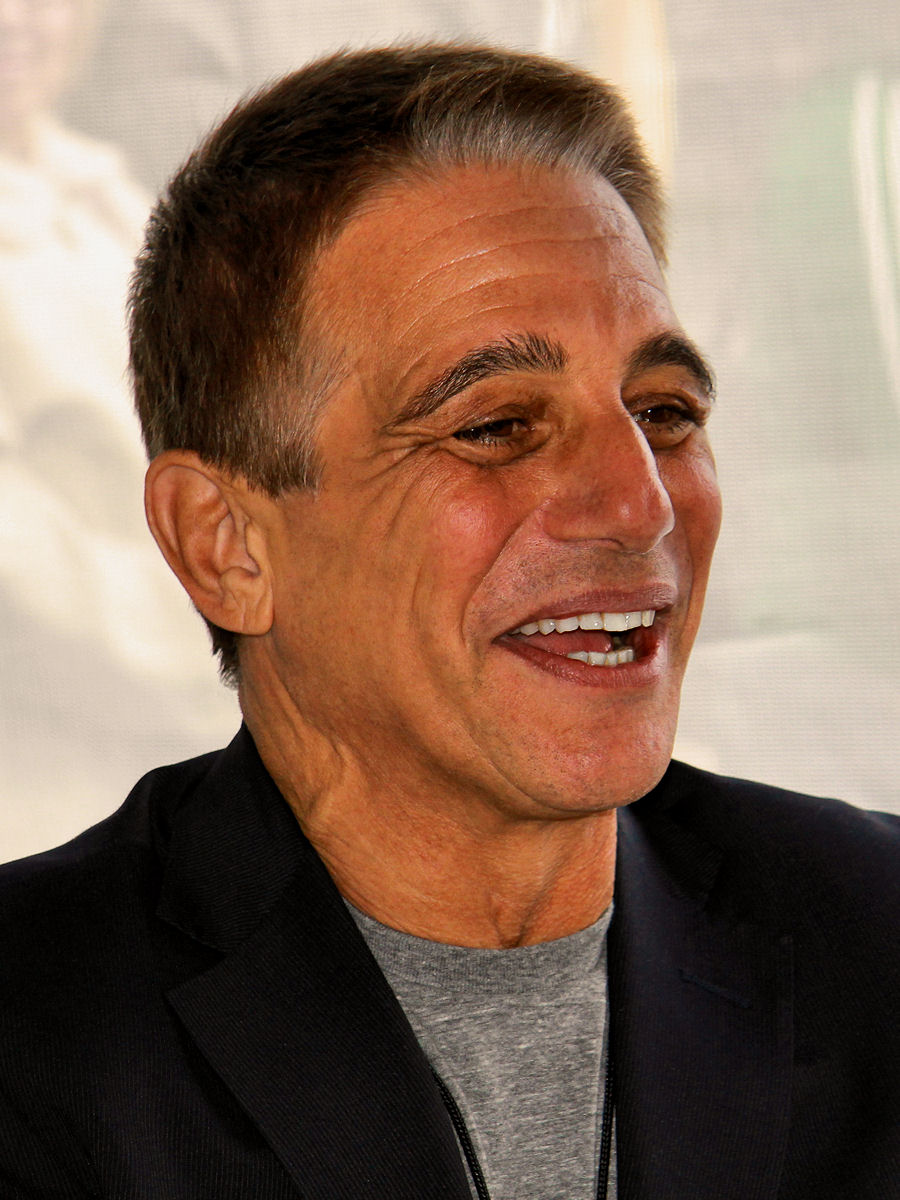
Danza in 2012

Shortly after his college graduation from the University of Dubuque, Danza was discovered by a producer at a boxing gymnasium in New York. He then earned a spot on the television show Taxi (1978–1983), playing a cab driver and part-time boxer Tony Banta, and later starred on Who's the Boss? (1984–1992), in which he portrayed Tony Micelli, a former baseball player, housekeeper, and single father. For his contribution to the television industry, in 1988, Danza was honored with a star on the Hollywood Walk of Fame at 7000 Hollywood Boulevard.

Danza's movie debut was in the comedy The Hollywood Knights (1980), which was followed by Going Ape! (1981), Cannonball Run II (1984), and She's Out of Control (1989). Later films included the role of Mel Clark, a baseball player, in Angels in the Outfield (1994), Juror No. 7 in the TV-movie 12 Angry Men (1997), and Fred in Crash (2004).

Danza also starred in the short-lived sitcoms Hudson Street (1995) and The Tony Danza Show (1997), not to be confused with his 2004–2006 talk show, The Tony Danza Show. He had a role in the TV drama Family Law from 2000 until 2002.

He was nominated for an Emmy Award for a guest-starring 1998 role in the TV series The Practice. He received critical acclaim for his performance in the 1999 Broadway revival of the Eugene O'Neill play The Iceman Cometh. In 2002, Danza released his debut album The House I Live In as a 1950s-style crooner.

Danza hosted his own TV talk show, The Tony Danza Show (2004–2006), that was produced each weekday morning in his hometown of New York and was syndicated across the US. On May 9, 2005, during a go-kart race with NASCAR star Rusty Wallace, who was a guest on the show, Danza's kart flipped after Wallace accidentally bumped him. Neither he nor Wallace was wearing a helmet at the time, and both were uninjured. Danza returned to go-kart racing on October 20, 2005, to challenge IndyCar driver Danica Patrick, but his brakes malfunctioned and he skidded into a wall, unharmed. His daytime talk show ended in May 2006; the last live episode aired on May 26, 2006.

He starred on Broadway as Max Bialystock in The Producers, from December 19, 2006, to March 11, 2007, and reprised his role at the Paris Las Vegas from August 13, 2007, to February 9, 2008.

Danza hosted the 4th season of The Contender in 2008.

A Broadway adaptation of the 1992 film Honeymoon in Vegas opened on a pre-Broadway run at New Jersey's Paper Mill Playhouse on September 26, 2013, co-starring Danza and Tony nominee Rob McClure, with Gary Griffin directing. Danza was inducted into the Ride of Fame in December 2014, and the double-decker sightseeing bus commemorated his role in the Broadway musical.

Danza portrayed Jon Martello Sr. in Don Jon (2013). He also starred as Tony Caruso Sr. in the 2018 Netflix series The Good Cop as "a disgraced, former NYPD officer who never followed the rules." It was canceled after one season.

=== Teaching ===
During the 2009–2010 school year, Danza filmed the A&E reality show Teach: Tony Danza, in which he co-instructed a 10th grade English class at Northeast High School in Philadelphia. It premiered on October 1, 2010. The book I'd Like to Apologize to Every Teacher I Ever Had: My Year as a Rookie Teacher at Northeast High (ISBN 9780307887863), which was released in 2012, was based on his year of teaching.

=== Community service ===
Danza created an organization called The Stars of Tomorrow Project. The organization introduces young adults to the borough of Manhattan in New York and a possible career in the arts.

== Personal life ==
Danza's first marriage was to Rhonda Yeoman. They wed in 1970, had a son, Marc Anthony, in January 1971, and divorced in 1974. Marc appeared with Danza on Taxi in two episodes as Brian Sims.

In 1986, Danza married Tracy Robinson. The couple separated in 2006 and filed for divorce on March 10, 2011; the divorce was finalized on February 6, 2013. They have two daughters, Katie and Emily.

In 2008, Danza and his son, Marc, co-authored a cookbook, Don't Fill Up on the Antipasto: Tony Danza's Father-Son Cookbook.

At one point Danza was a partner in Alleva Dairy, promoted as America's oldest cheese shop, on Grand Street in the Little Italy section of Manhattan.

== Professional boxing record ==
Key to abbreviations used for results
DQ	Disqualification	RTD	Corner retirement
KO	Knockout	SD	Split decision / split draw
MD	Majority decision / majority draw	TD	Technical decision / technical draw
NC	No contest	TKO	Technical knockout
PTS	Points decision	UD	Unanimous decision / unanimous draw

Boxing record
No.	Result	Record	Opponent	Type	Round(s)	Time	Date	Location	Notes
11	Win	8–3	Johnny Heard	KO	3 (8)	0:45	May 14, 1979	Phoenix, Arizona, US	
10	Win	7–3	Max Hord	KO	1 (10)		April 27, 1979	Felt Forum, New York City	
9	Win	6–3	Billy Perez	KO	1 (8)	0:44	May 26, 1978	Brooklyn, New York City	
8	Win	5–3	Ray Bryant	KO	1 (8)		December 21, 1977	Roll-a-Rama, Brooklyn, New York City	
7	Loss	4–3	Morris Watkins	TKO	1 (8)		November 9, 1977	Westchester County Center, White Plains, New York City	
6	Win	4–2	Ralph Garcia	TKO	1 (8)		September 9, 1977	Nanuet, New York City	
5	Win	3–2	Joey Mascetti	TKO	1 (6)		May 24, 1977	Westchester County Center, White Plains, New York City	
4	Win	2–2	Tom Molloy	KO	3 (6)	1:24	May 6, 1977	Long Island Arena, Commack, New York City	
3	Loss	1–2	Barry Hill	Points	4		April 21, 1977	Dover, New Jersey, USA	
2	Loss	1–1	John LoCicero	KO	1 (4)		October 1, 1976	Sunnyside Gardens, Queens, New York City	
1	Win	1–0	Earl Harris	KO	1 (4)		August 13, 1976	New York City	

== Filmography ==
=== Film ===
Year	Title	Role	Notes
1980	The Hollywood Knights	Duke	
1981	Going Ape!	Foster	
1983	Cannonball Run II	Tony	
1988	Mr. Thompson and His Bananas	Tony Thompson	
1988	Wall of Tyranny (a.k.a. Freedom Fighter)	Victor Ross	
1989	She's Out of Control	Doug Simpson	
1989	I'm from Hollywood	Himself	
1994	Angels in the Outfield	Mel Clark	
1996	Illtown	D'Avalon	
1996	Dear God	Himself	Uncredited
1997	Glam	Sid Dalgren	
1997	The Girl Gets Moe	Moe	
1997	A Brooklyn State of Mind	Louie Crisci	
1997	Meet Wally Sparks	New York Cab Driver	
2004	The Whisper	Simon	
2004	Crash	Fred	
2006	Cloud 9	Himself	Uncredited
2009	The Nail: The Story of Joey Nardone	Chickie	
2010	Firedog	Rocky	
2013	Don Jon	Jon Martello Sr.	
2013	Aftermath	King	
2021	Rumble	Siggy (voice)	
2022	Darby and the Dead	Gary	
2025	Re-Election	Stanislaw Bauer	

=== Television ===
Year	Title	Role	Notes
1978–1983	Taxi	Tony Banta	Main role; 114 episodes
1980	Murder Can Hurt You	Pony Lambretta	Television film
1983	The Love Boat	Bud O'Hara	2 episodes
1984	Single Bars, Single Women	Dennis	Television film
1984–1992	Who's the Boss?	Tony Micelli	Lead role; 196 episodes
1986	Sesame Street	Himself	3 episodes
1986	Doing Life	Jerry Rosenberg	Television film
1988	1988 Kids' Choice Awards	Host	
1988	Freedom Fighter	Vic Ross	Television film
1989	Hanna-Barbera's 50th: A Yabba Dabba Doo Celebration	Host	Television film
1991	The Whereabouts of Jenny	Rowdy Patron	Television film
1991	Dead and Alive: The Race for Gus Farace	Constabile "Gus" Farace	Television film
1991–1992	Baby Talk	Baby Mickey Campbell (voice)	35 episodes
1994	The Mighty Jungle	Vinnie, The Alligator (voice)	Unknown episodes
1994	The Mighty Jungle	Vinnie, The Alligator (voice)	Television film
1995	Deadly Whispers	Tom Acton	Television film
1995–1996	Hudson Street	Tony Canetti	22 episodes
1996	North Shore Fish	Sal	Television film
1997	12 Angry Men	Juror No. 7	Television film
1997–1998	The Tony Danza Show	Tony DiMeo	14 episodes
1998	The Garbage Picking Field Goal Kicking Philadelphia Phenomenon	Barney Gorman	Television film
1998	The Practice	Tommy Silva	4 episodes
1998	Noah	Norman Waters	Television film
1998	A Capitol Fourth	Himself (host)	
2000–2002	Family Law	Joe Celano	25 episodes
2000	King of the Hill	Himself (voice)	Episode: "Peggy's Fan Fair"
2001	Family Guy	Himself (voice)	Episode: "Ready, Willing and Disabled"
2001	Bette	Himself	Episode: “Of Men and Meatballs”
2003	Stealing Christmas	Jack Clayton / Santa	Television film
2004–2006	The Tony Danza Show	Himself	Host; 330 episodes
2005	All My Children	Hotel Manager	Episode: "May 18, 2005"
2007	A Capitol Fourth	Himself (host)	
2008	Rita Rocks	Matt Morelli	Episode: "The Crying Game"
2010	Teach: Tony Danza	Himself	7 episodes
2016	Broad City	Mr. Abrams	Episode: "Philadelphia"
2016	Sebastian Says	Salvo	Television film
2017	There's... Johnny!	Fred de Cordova	6 episodes
2018	The Good Cop	Tony Caruso Sr.	10 episodes
2020	Outmatched	Jay Bennett	Episode: "Grandparents"
2022	Blue Bloods	Lieutenant Raymond Moretti	Episode: "Allegiance"
2022	Finding Your Roots	Himself	Episode: "Fighters"
2022–2026	Power Book III: Raising Kanan	Stefano Marchetti	Guest (season 2); Recurring role (seasons 3–5)
2023	And Just Like That...	Himself	Episode: "The Real Deal"
2023	Dick Van Dyke 98 Years of Magic	Himself	
2023	Tacoma FD	Lawrence	S4E11 "It's a Penisi-ful Life"

== Books ==
- Danza, Tony and Marc (2008). Don't Fill Up on the Antipasto: Tony Danza's Father-Son Cookbook. Scribner. ISBN 978-1-41654-487-6.
- Danza, Tony (2012). I'd Like to Apologize to Every Teacher I Ever Had: My Year as a Rookie Teacher at Northeast High. Crown Archetype. ISBN 978-0-30788-786-3.

== Awards and nominations ==
- Nominated – Golden Globe Award for Best Supporting Actor – Series, Miniseries or Television Film for Taxi (1979)
- Nominated for the Golden Globe Award for Best Actor – Television Series Musical or Comedy for Who's the Boss? (1986)
- Nominated for the Golden Globe Award for Best Actor – Television Series Musical or Comedy for Who's the Boss? (1987)
- Nominated for the Golden Globe Award for Best Actor – Television Series Musical or Comedy for Who's the Boss? (1989)
- Nominated – Golden Raspberry Award for Worst Actor for She's Out of Control (1989)
- Nominated – TV Land Award for Single Dad of the Year for Who's the Boss?
- Won the People's Choice Award for Favorite Male Performer in a Television Series for The Tony Danza Show (1997)
- Nominated for the Primetime Emmy Award for Outstanding Guest Actor in a Drama Series for The Practice (1998)

Preceded by Donny and Marie Osmond	Host of Miss America; 2002	Succeeded by Wayne Brady
