= List of films about computers =

This is a list of films about computers, featuring fictional films in which activities involving computers play a central role in the development of the plot.

== Artificial intelligence plots ==
=== Motion picture ===
- 2001: A Space Odyssey (1968)
  - HAL 9000
- The Computer Wore Tennis Shoes (1969)
- Colossus: The Forbin Project (1970)
- The Questor Tapes (1974)
- Demon Seed (1977)
- Blade Runner (1982)
- Tron (1982)
- WarGames (1983)
- Brainstorm (1983)
- 2010 (1984)
  - HAL 9000
  - SAL 9000
- Hide and Seek (1984, TV movie)
- Electric Dreams (1984)
- The Terminator (1984)
  - Terminator
  - Skynet
- D.A.R.Y.L. (1985)
- Flight of the Navigator (1986)
- Short Circuit (1986)
- Not Quite Human (1987)
- Short Circuit 2 (1988)
- Not Quite Human II (1989)
- Still Not Quite Human (1992)
- Arcade (1993)
- Star Trek Generations (1994)
- Hackers (1995)
- Johnny Mnemonic (1995)
- The Net (1995)
- Star Trek: First Contact (1996)
- Enemy of the State (1998)
- Lost in Space (1998)
- Star Trek: Insurrection (1998)
- Bicentennial Man (1999)
- The Matrix (1999)
- The Thirteenth Floor (1999)
- Universal Soldier: The Return (1999)
- Virus (1999)
- A.I. Artificial Intelligence (2001)
- How to Make a Monster (2001)
- Swordfish (2001)
- S1M0NE (2002)
- Star Trek: Nemesis (2002)
- The Matrix Reloaded (2003)
- The Matrix Revolutions (2003)
- I Robot (2004)
- The Hitchhiker's Guide to the Galaxy (2005)
- Live Free or Die Hard (2007)
- Eagle Eye (2008)
- Iron Man (2008)
- Moon (2009)
  - GERTY 3000
- Iron Man 2 (2010)
- Wreck-It Ralph (2012)
- Computer Chess (2013)
- Her (2013)
- Iron Man 3 (2013)
- The Machine (2013)
- Automata (2014)
- Transcendence (2014)
- Interstellar (2014)
- Vice (2015)
- Ex Machina (2015)
- Avengers: Age of Ultron (2015)
- Morgan (2016)
- Upgrade (2018)
- Tau (2018)
- Archive (2020)
- Superintelligence (2020)
- Free Guy (2021)
- Share? (2023)
- The Creator (2023)
- M3GAN (2022)
- M3GAN 2.0 (2025)

=== Television series ===
- Person Of Interest (2011-2016)
- Next (2020)
- Mrs. Davis (2023)

== Computers as plot devices ==
=== Motion picture ===
- Desk Set (1957)
- The Honeymoon Machine (1961)
- Alphaville (1965)
- Billion Dollar Brain (1967)
- The Andromeda Strain (1971)
- Cloak & Dagger (1984)
- Revenge of the Nerds (1984)
- The Machine That Changed the World (1992, TV miniseries)
- Pi (1998)
- Pirates of Silicon Valley (1999)
  - Altair 8800
- The First $20 Million Is Always the Hardest (2002)
- Micro Men (2009)
- The Social Network (2010)
- Jobs (2013)
- The Imitation Game (2014)
- Steve Jobs (2015)
- Everything Everywhere All at Once (2022)

=== Television series ===
- Computer Chronicles (1983 - 2002)
- Net Cafe (1996 - 2002)
- Triumph of the Nerds: The Rise of Accidental Empires (1996)
- Nerds 2.0.1: A Brief History of the Internet (1998)
- NerdTV (2005)
- The IT Crowd (2006-2013)
- It's All Geek to Me (2007)
- Halt and Catch Fire (2014 - 2017)
  - IBM 5110
  - IBM Personal Computer XT
  - Commodore 64
  - Macintosh 128K
  - NeXT Computer
  - AT&T UNIX PC
- Silicon Valley (2014 - 2019)
- Valley of the Boom (2019)

=== Documentaries ===
- A Tale of Two Cities: The Circuit City Story (2010)
- All Watched Over by Machines of Loving Grace (2011)
- Steve Jobs: The Lost Interview (2012)
- Web Junkie (2013)
- Silicon Cowboys (2016)

== Hacking as a plot narrative ==
=== Motion picture ===
- The Italian Job (1969)
- Tron (1982)
- WarGames (1983)
  - IMSAI 8080
- Cloak & Dagger (1984)
- Prime Risk (1985)
- Ferris Bueller's Day Off (1986)
- Sneakers (1992)
- Blank Check (1994)
- Hackers (1995)
- The Net (1995)
- Under Siege 2: Dark Territory (1995)
- Masterminds (1997)
- 23 (1998)
- Entrapment (1999)
- Track Down (2000)
- Swordfish (2001)
- The Score (2001)
- What's the Worst That Could Happen? (2001)
- Code Hunter (2002)
- Bedwin Hacker (2003)
- The Italian Job (2003)
- Foolproof (2003)
- The Incredibles (2004)
- Sky Captain and the World of Tomorrow (2004)
- Firewall (2006)
- The Net 2.0 (2006)
- Live Free or Die Hard (2007)
- WALL-E (2008)
- WarGames: The Dead Code (2008)
- Untraceable (2008)
- The Social Network (2010)
- Robot & Frank (2012)
- The Fifth Estate (2013)
- Disconnect (2013)
- Open Windows (2014)
- Who Am I – No System Is Safe (2014)
- Blackhat (2015)
- Chappie (2015)
- The Throwaways (2015)
- Snowden (2016)
- Hacker (2016)
- I.T. (2016)
- Anon (2018)
- Dark Web: Cicada 3301 (2021)
- Wardriver (2026)

=== Documentaries ===
- Hacking Democracy (HBO, Emmy nominated for Outstanding Investigative Journalism, 2006)
- Hackers: Wizards of the Electronic Age (1984)
- Hackers in Wonderland (2000)
- Revolution OS (2001)
- The Code (2001)
- Freedom Downtime (2001)
- The Secret History of Hacking (2001)
- In the Realm of the Hackers (2002)
- BBS: The Documentary (2004)
- The Code-Breakers (2006)
- Steal This Film (2006)
- Hackers Are People Too (2008)
- Hackers Wanted (not officially released, but leaked in 2010)
- The Virtual Revolution (2010)
- We Are Legion (2012)
- The Internet's Own Boy: The Story of Aaron Swartz (2014)
- Citizenfour (2014)
- Zero Days (2016)
- Lo and Behold, Reveries of the Connected World (2016)
- Cyberbunker: The Criminal Underworld (2023)

=== Television series ===
- The Net (TV Series) (1998 - 1999)
- Person of Interest (2011 - 2016)
- CSI: Cyber (2015 - 2016)
- Scorpion (2014 - 2018)
- Mr. Robot (2015 - 2019)
- Stalk (2020 - )

== Virtual reality ==
- World on a Wire (1973)
- Welcome to Blood City (1977)
- Tron (1982)
- Brainstorm (1983)
- The Lawnmower Man (1992)
- Disclosure (1994)
- Brainscan (1994)
- Kôkaku kidôtai (Ghost in the Shell) (1995)
- Strange Days (1995)
- Virtuosity (1995)
- VR.5 (1995)
- Johnny Mnemonic (1995)
- Lawnmower Man 2: Beyond Cyberspace (1996)
- Nirvana (1997)
- eXistenZ (1999)
- The Matrix (1999)
- The Thirteenth Floor (1999)
- Avalon (2001)
- Storm Watch (aka Code Hunter) (2002)
- Code Lyoko (2003)
- The Matrix Reloaded (2003)
- The Matrix Revolutions (2003)
- Avatar (2004)
- Inosensu: Kôkaku kidôtai (Ghost in the Shell 2: Innocence) (2004)
- Cargo (2009)
- Gamer (2009)
- Tron: Legacy (2010)
- Transcendence (2014)
- Ready Player One (2018)
- Free Guy (2021)

== Viruses ==
- Superman III (1983)
- Office Space (1999)
- Pulse (2006)

== Programming ==
- Disclosure (1994)
- Pi (1998)
- Pirates of Silicon Valley (1999)
  - Altair 8800
- Code Rush (2000)
- The Code (2001)
- Antitrust (2001)
- How to Make a Monster (2001)
- Revolution OS (2001)
- Dopamine (2003)
- One Point O (2004)
- Control Alt Delete (2008)
- The Social Network (2010)
- Hidden Figures (2016)
  - IBM 7090

== Websites ==
=== Motion picture ===
- FeardotCom (2002)
- On Line (2002)
- I-See-You.Com (2006)
- Untraceable (2008)
- Catfish (2010)
- The Social Network (2010)
- The Craigslist Killer (2011)
- The Internship (2013)
- The Circle (2017)

=== Documentaries ===
- Home Page (1998)
- e-Dreams (2001)
- Startup.com (2001)
- Google: Behind the Screen (2006)
- Steal This Film (2006)
- Steal This Film II (2006)
- Google: The Thinking Factory (2007)
- Download: The True Story of the Internet (2008)
- The Truth According to Wikipedia (2008)
- The Pirate Bay Away From Keyboard (2013)

== Communications ==
- Electric Dreams (1984)
- Blank Check (1994)
- You've Got Mail (1998)
- Chatroom (2010)
- Cyberbully (2011)
- Cyberbully (2015)
- Profile (2018)

== Supernatural ==
- Evilspeak (1981)
- Weird Science (1985)
- Ghost in the Machine (1993)
- Ghost Machine (2009)
- Unfriended (2014) (alternative title: Cybernatural)

== War ==
- Dr. Strangelove (1964)
  - Doomsday device
- Colossus: The Forbin Project (1970)
- Firefox (1982)
- WarGames (1983)
- Brainstorm (1983)
- Stealth (2005)

== Space ==
- Apollo 13 (1995)
  - Apollo Guidance Computer
- RocketMan (1997)
- From the Earth to the Moon (1998, TV miniseries)
  - Apollo Guidance Computer

== Anime ==
- Ghost in the Shell (1995)
- Serial Experiments Lain (1998)
- Chobits (2002)
- Ghost in the Shell: Stand Alone Complex (2002-2003)
- Ghost in the Shell 2: Innocence (2004)
- Ghost in the Shell: S.A.C. 2nd GIG (2004)
- Ergo Proxy (2006)
- Ghost in the Shell: Stand Alone Complex: Solid State Society (2006)

== See also ==
- List of fictional computers
- List of fictional robots and androids
- List of cyberpunk films
- Computer screen film
