= List of depictions of Steve Jobs =

Steve Jobs was an American pioneer of the personal computer revolution of the 1970s who, along with Steve Wozniak and Ronald Wayne, founded Apple Computer. Before and after his death in 2011, Jobs was known as a counter-culture figure within the computer industry, and as a perfectionist who could be demanding of his colleagues and employees—sometimes to the point of cruelty.

Jobs's official biographer, Walter Isaacson, described him as a "creative entrepreneur whose passion for perfection and ferocious drive revolutionized six industries: personal computers, animated movies, music, phones, tablet computing, and digital publishing".

== Books ==
=== Biographies and histories ===
- 1984: The Little Kingdom: The Private Story of Apple Computer by Michael Moritz (the first history of Apple Computer, updated and reissued as Return to the Little Kingdom: Steve Jobs and the Creation of Apple in 2009)
- 1984: Hackers: Heroes of the Computer Revolution by Steven Levy
- 1984: Fire in the Valley: The Making of the Personal Computer by Michael Swaine and Paul Frieberger (Fire in the Valley: The Making of the Personal Computer, second edition, 2000 and Fire in the Valley: The Birth and Death of the Personal Computer, third edition, 2014; the basis for the 1999 film, Pirates of Silicon Valley by Martyn Burke).
- 1988: Steve Jobs: The Journey Is the Reward by Jeffrey S. Young
- 1988: Accidental millionaire: the rise and fall of Steve Jobs at Apple Computer by Lee Butcher.
- 1992: Accidental Empires by Robert X. Cringely (the basis for the 1996 PBS documentary, Triumph of the Nerds)
- 1993: Steve Jobs & the NeXT Big Thing by Randall E. Stross
- 1994: Insanely Great: The Life and Times of Macintosh, the Computer That Changed Everything by Steven Levy
- 2000: The Second Coming of Steve Jobs by Alan Deutschman.
- 2004: Revolution in the Valley: The Insanely Great Story of How the Mac was Made by Andy Hertzfeld
- 2005: iCon: Steve Jobs by Jeffrey S. Young & William L. Simon.
- 2005: What the Dormouse Said: How the 60s Counterculture Shaped the Personal Computer Industry by John Markoff
- 2011: Steve Jobs by Walter Isaacson (the basis for the 2015 film, Steve Jobs by Danny Boyle)
- 2012: Steve Jobs: The man who thought different by Karen Blumenthal
- 2014: Creativity, Inc.: Overcoming the Unseen Forces That Stand in the Way of True Inspiration by Edwin Catmull of Pixar
- 2015: Becoming Steve Jobs by Brent Schlender and Rick Tetzeli
- 2015: Steve Jobs and Philosophy: For Those Who Think Different, edited by Shawn E. Klein
- 2026: Steve Jobs in Exile

=== Autobiographies and memoirs ===
- 2006: iWoz by Steve Wozniak
- 2013: The Bite in the Apple: A Memoir of My Life with Steve Jobs by Chrisann Brennan
- 2014: Steve Jobs: The Unauthorized Autobiography by J. T. Owens
- 2018: Small Fry by Lisa Brennan-Jobs
- 2023: Make Something Wonderful by Leslie Berlin

=== Graphic novels ===
- 2012: The Zen of Steve Jobs by Caleb Melby with artwork by Jess3 that explores the relationship between Jobs and Kobun Chino Otogawa.
- 2012: Steve Jobs: Genius by Design a biographical graphic work by Jason Quinn (published by Campfire Graphic Novels)
- 2015: Steve Jobs: Insanely Great by Jessie Hartland.

== Films and television series ==
=== Feature films ===
- 1999: Pirates of Silicon Valley, a television film directed by Martyn Burke and released on TNT. Jobs is portrayed by Noah Wyle opposite Anthony Michael Hall playing Bill Gates.
- 2013: Jobs, an independent film directed by Joshua Michael Stern. Jobs is portrayed by Ashton Kutcher.
- 2013: iSteve, a satirical film directed by Ryan Perez in which Jobs is portrayed by Justin Long.
- 2015: Steve Jobs, a feature film directed by Danny Boyle, with a screenplay by Aaron Sorkin. Jobs is portrayed by Michael Fassbender and Wozniak by Seth Rogen.

=== Documentaries ===
- 1992: "The Paperback Computer". Part three of the five-part documentary The Machine That Changed the World prominently featured Jobs and his role in the early days of Apple.
- 1996: Triumph of the Nerds, directed by Paul Sen, written and narrated by Robert X. Cringely. The film contains clips of interviews with Jobs conducted by Cringely in 1995.
- 2001: Golden Dreams, a short film about the history of California shown at Disney California Adventure Park. Jobs is portrayed by Mark Neveldine.
- 2011: Steve Jobs: One Last Thing, a documentary film produced by PBS. A slightly shortened and localized version of the show was broadcast on Channel 4 in the United Kingdom the following day titled, Steve Jobs: iChanged the World.
- 2011: iGenius: How Steve Jobs Changed the World, a Discovery Channel documentary hosted by Adam Savage and Jamie Hyneman (the hosts of MythBusters).
- 2011: Steve Jobs: Billion Dollar Hippy, a 2011 documentary TV film produced by BBC.
- 2012: Steve Jobs: The Lost Interview, directed by Paul Sen, written and narrated by Robert X. Cringely. The film includes the full 70-minute interview Jobs gave to Cringely for Triumph of the Nerds in 1995.
- 2015: Steve Jobs: The Man in the Machine, directed by Alex Gibney.
- 2015: Steve Jobs vs. Bill Gates: The Competition to Control the Personal Computer, 1974–1999. Original film from the National Geographic Channel for the American Genius series.

=== Television series ===
- 2011: American animated sitcom South Park parodies Jobs as a maniac who kidnaps one of the characters to be a part of a "HumancentiPad" in the season 15 episode "HumancentiPad".
- 2021: American Horror Story: Double Feature. The tenth season of the FX series American Horror Story features a fictionalized cameo of Jobs in the eighth episode in which he is played by Len Cordova.

== Theater and opera ==
- 2012: The Agony and Ecstasy of Steve Jobs – The Public Theater, New York City, created and performed by Mike Daisey.
- 2017: The (R)evolution of Steve Jobs – Santa Fe Opera, composed by Mason Bates with libretto by Mark Campbell.
- 2018: Plague – transmediale festival, composed by James Ferraro.

== Web video and games ==
- 2013: YouTube channel Epic Rap Battles of History (ERB) depicts Jobs in a rap battle against Bill Gates. Jobs is portrayed by ERB co-creator Nice Peter.
- 2017: Jobs's 80s appearance was referenced in the video game Computer Tycoon; however he sports a blonde haircut rather than his black haircut.
- 2018: "Steve Jobs: Reboot!", an episode of Over My Dead Body. Jobs is the subject of a parody post-death interview on Amazon Prime TV comedy series.

== Fine art ==
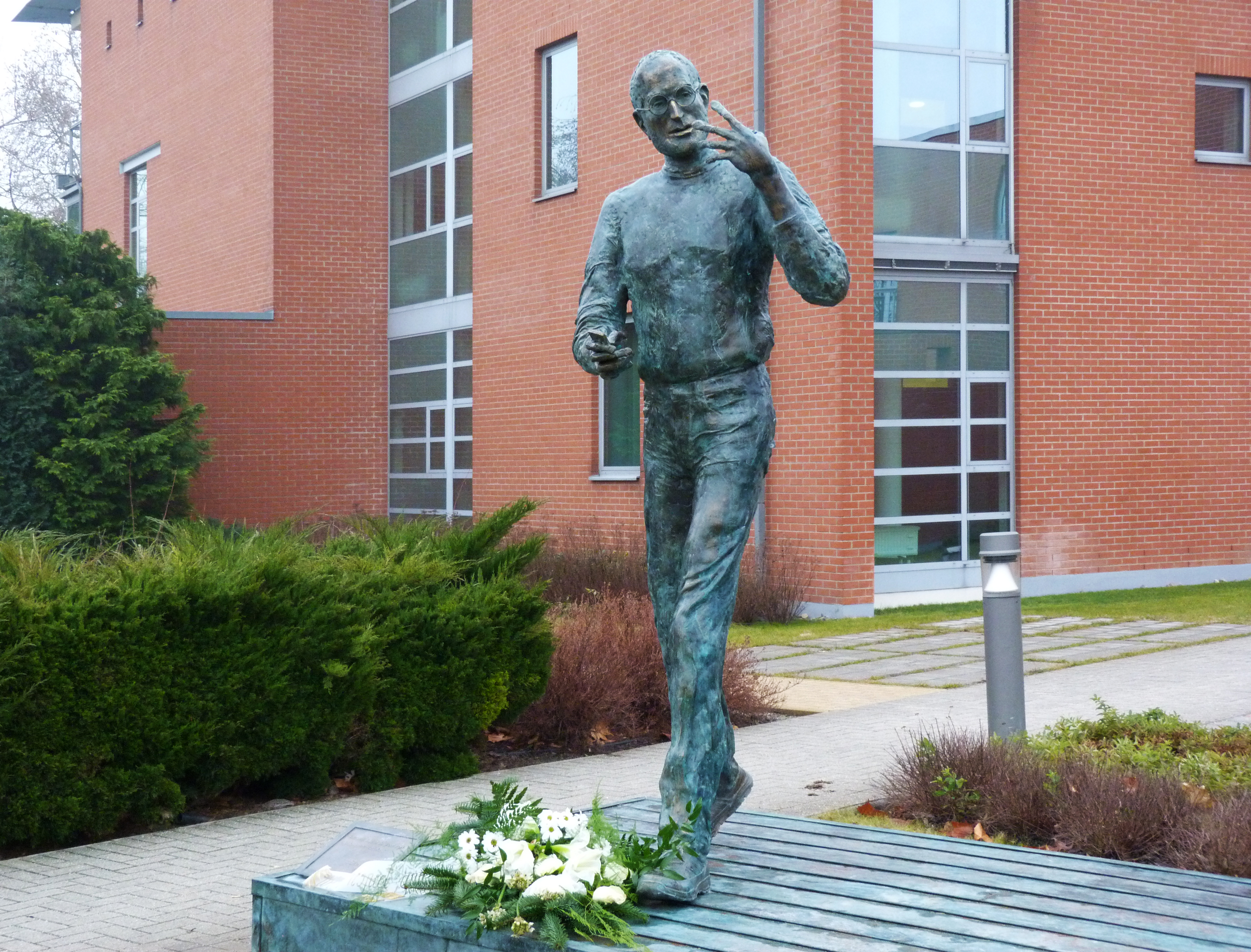
A statue of Jobs at Graphisoft Park in Budapest

- 2011: A statue of Jobs is in Graphisoft Park in Budapest, Hungary.
- 2015: The Son of a Migrant from Syria, a mural near Calais, France, by street artist Banksy.

== Miscellaneous ==
- 1997: An early version of Apple's "Think different" ad was narrated by Jobs but never released on television.
- 1999: Noah Wyle, who played Jobs in the 1999 film Pirates of Silicon Valley, appeared on stage at the 1999 Macworld as Steve Jobs, before being joined by Jobs himself.
- 2026: Vietnam’s high school graduation examination sparked attention for the question: "The United States has Steve Jobs, Mark Zuckerberg, Elon Musk, etc. whose technological innovations have helped change the world. Drawing on this context, write an argumentative paragraph (approximately 200 words) from the perspective of a young person to answer the question: How can we have "Vietnam's Steve Jobs"?"
