= Steve Jobs (disambiguation) =

Steve Jobs (1955–2011) was an American business magnate and co-founder of Apple Inc.

Steve Jobs may also refer to:

- Steve Jobs (book), a 2011 biography about Jobs by Walter Isaacson
- Jobs (film), a 2013 drama film about Steve Jobs
- Steve Jobs (film), a 2015 drama film about Steve Jobs
- Steve Jobs: The Lost Interview, 2012 documentary film
- Steve Jobs: The Man in the Machine, a 2015 documentary about Jobs
- Steve Jobs (clothing company), Italian brand

== See also ==
- List of artistic depictions of Steve Jobs
