= Second Coming (disambiguation) =

The Second Coming generally refers to the Christian belief that Jesus Christ will return to Earth.

Second Coming may also refer to:

== In religion ==
- Second Coming (LDS Church), beliefs specific to the Church of Jesus Christ of Latter-day Saints
- The Second Coming or The Next Master of the Aetherius Society

== In art, media, and entertainment ==
=== Film ===
- The Second Coming (1992 film), a film starring Blair Underwood
- Second Coming (film), a 2014 film directed by debbie tucker green
- The Second Coming (2014 film), directed by Herman Yau

=== Literature ===
- The Second Coming (Masterson novel), a 2000 novel by Andrew Masterson
- The Second Coming (Percy novel), a 1980 novel by Walker Percy
- "The Second Coming" (poem), a 1920 poem by William Butler Yeats
- 'Salem's Lot or Second Coming, a 1975 novel by Stephen King
- The Second Coming: A Leatherdyke Reader, a book edited by Patrick Califia and Robin Sweeney
- The Second Coming: A Love Story, a 2014 novel by Scott Pinsker

==== Comics ====
- X-Men: Second Coming, a 2010 crossover storyline published by Marvel Comics
- Second Coming (comic book series), a 2019 comic book series created by Mark Russell and Richard Pace

=== Music ===
- Second Coming (band), a band from the Seattle area

==== Albums ====
- 2nd Coming (Mr. Del album), 2000
- Second Coming (The Stone Roses album), 1994
- Second Coming (Second Coming album), 1998
- Second Coming (Dickies album), 1989
- Second Coming (Shotgun Messiah album), 1991
- Second Coming (Stryper album), 2013
- The Second Coming (Adina Howard album), 2004
- The Second Coming (Little Richard album), 1972
- The Second Coming (TQ album), 2000
- The Second Coming (Church of Misery album), 2004
- The Second Coming (video), by Kiss, 1998
- Ghost Opera: The Second Coming, a reissue of Ghost Opera by Kamelot

==== Songs ====
- "Second Coming", a song by Alice Cooper on the album Love It to Death (1971)
- "The Second Coming", a track by Whitehouse from Birthdeath Experience (1980)
- "The Second Coming", a song by Juelz Santana

=== Television ===
- "The Second Coming" (Heroes), a 2008 episode of the NBC TV drama Heroes
- "The Second Coming" (The Sopranos), an episode of the American television series The Sopranos
- The Second Coming (TV serial), a British television drama starring Christopher Eccleston
- Battlestar Galactica: The Second Coming, a 1999 movie pilot for a proposed Battlestar Galactica TV series that never aired

=== Fictional characters ===
- The Second Coming, a character in the Animator vs. Animation series created and animated by Alan Becker

== See also ==
- Broly: Second Coming, a Dragon Ball Z movie
- The Second Coming of Steve Jobs, a 2000 biography of the Apple, Inc. founder
