= Revolution OS =

2001 documentary film

- Promotional poster for two disc edition of Revolution OS
- Directed by: J. T. S. Moore
- Written by: J. T. S. Moore
- Produced by: J. T. S. Moore
- Starring: Richard Stallman; Linus Torvalds; Eric S. Raymond; Bruce Perens
- Edited by: J. T. S. Moore
- Music by: Christopher Anderson-Bazzoli
- Release date: 2001
- Running time: 85 min
- Country: United States
- Language: English

Revolution OS is a 2001 documentary film that traces the twenty-year history of GNU, Linux, open source, and the free software movement.

Directed by J. T. S. Moore, the film features interviews with prominent hackers and entrepreneurs including Richard Stallman, Michael Tiemann, Linus Torvalds, Larry Augustin, Eric S. Raymond, Bruce Perens, Frank Hecker and Brian Behlendorf.

== Synopsis ==
The film begins with glimpses of Raymond, a Linux IPO, Torvalds, the idea of Open Source, Perens, Stallman, then sets the historical stage in the early days of hackers and computer hobbyists when code was shared freely. It discusses how change came in 1978 as Microsoft co-founder Bill Gates, in his Open Letter to Hobbyists, pointedly prodded hobbyists to pay up. Stallman relates his struggles with proprietary software vendors at the MIT Artificial Intelligence Lab, leading to his departure to focus on the development of free software, and the GNU Project.

Torvalds describes the development of the Linux kernel, the GNU/Linux naming controversy, Linux's further evolution, and its commercialization.

Raymond and Stallman clarify the philosophy of free software versus communism and capitalism, as well as the development stages of Linux.

Michael Tiemann discusses meeting Stallman in 1987, getting an early version of Stallman's GCC, and founding Cygnus Solutions.

Larry Augustin describes combining GNU software with a normal PC to create a Unix-like workstation at one third the price and twice the power of a Sun workstation. He relates his early dealings with venture capitalists, the eventual capitalization and commodification of Linux for his own company, VA Linux, and its IPO.

Brian Behlendorf, one of the original developers of the Apache HTTP Server, explains that he started to exchange patches for the NCSA web server daemon HTTPd with other developers, which led to the release of "a patchy" web server, dubbed Apache.

Frank Hecker of Netscape discusses the events leading up to Netscape's executives releasing the source code for Netscape's browser, one of the signal events which made open source a force to be reckoned with by business executives, the mainstream media, and the public at large. This point was validated further after the film's release as the Netscape source code eventually became the Firefox web browser, reclaiming a large percentage of market share from Microsoft's Internet Explorer.

The film also documents the scope of the first full-scale LinuxWorld Summit conference, with appearances by Linus Torvalds and Larry Augustin on the keynote stage.

Much of the footage for the film was shot in Silicon Valley.

== Screenings ==
The film appeared in several film festivals including South by Southwest, the Atlanta Film and Video Festival, Boston Film Festival, and Denver International Film Festival; it won Best Documentary at both the Savannah Film and Video Festival and the Kudzu Film Festival.

== Quotes ==
I bumped into him (Craig Mundie of Microsoft) in an elevator. I looked at his badge and said, "Ah, I see you work for Microsoft."

He looked back at me and said, "Oh yeah, and what do you do?"

And I thought he seemed just some sort of a tad dismissive, I mean here is the archetypal guy in a suit looking at a scruffy hacker. . . so I gave him the thousand yard stare and said, "I'm your worst nightmare."

— Eric S. Raymond

Giving the Linus Torvalds award to the Free Software Foundation is sort of like giving the Han Solo award to the Rebel Fleet.

— Richard Stallman

. . . and I realised he (Steve Ballmer) had read my document and understood it, and was now telling the press about this. Now, if you're like just a guy on the net who's not doing this for a job at all and you sort of write a manifesto and it spreads out through the world, and a year later the Vice President of Microsoft is talking about that, you'd think you were on drugs, wouldn't you? But that's what really happened.

— Bruce Perens

Think of Richard Stallman as the great philosopher and think of me as the engineer.

— Linus Torvalds

== Reception ==
Every review noted the historical significance of the information, and those that noticed found the production values high, but the presentation of history mainly too dry, even resembling a lecture. Ron Wells of Film Threat found the film important, worthwhile, and well thought out for explaining the principles of the free software and open source concepts. Noting its failure to represent on camera any debate with representatives of the proprietary software camp, Wells gave the film 4 of 5 stars. TV Guide rated the film 3 of 4 stars: "surprisingly exciting", "fascinating" and "sharp looking" with a good soundtrack. Daily Variety saw the film as "targeted equally at the techno-illiterate and the savvy-hacker crowd;" educating and patting one group on the head, and canonizing the other, but strong enough for an "enjoyable" recommendation.

On the negative side, The New York Times faulted the film's one-sidedness, found its reliance on jargon "fairly dense going", and gave no recommendation. Internet Reviews found it "a didactic and dull documentary glorifying software anarchy. Raging against Microsoft and Sun. . .", lacking follow-through on Red Hat and VALinux stock (in 2007, at 2% of peak value), with "lots of talking heads". Toxicuniverse.com noted "Revolution OS blatantly serves as infomercial and propaganda. Bearded throwback to the sixties, hacker Richard Stallman serves as the movement's spiritual leader while Scandinavian Linus Torvalds acts as its mild mannered chief engineer (as developer of the Linux kernel)."

To Tim Lord, reviewing for Slashdot, the film is interesting and worthy of viewing, with some misgivings: it is "about the growth of the free software movement, and its eventual co-option by the open source movement. . . it was supposed to be about Linux and its battle about Microsoft, but the movie is quickly hijacked by its participants." The film "lacks the staple of documentaries: scenes with multiple people that are later analyzed individually by each of the participants" (or indeed, much back-and-forth at all). Linux itself and its benefits are notably missing, and, "[w]e are never shown anyone using Linux, except for unhappy users at an Installfest." The debate over Linux vs Windows is missing, showing the origin of the OS only as a response to proprietary and expensive Sun and DEC software and hardware, and its growth solely due to the Apache web server. And Lord notes that the film shows, but does not challenge Torvalds or Stallman about their equally disingenuous remarks about the "Linux" vs "GNU/Linux" naming issue.

== See also ==
- The Code – another documentary film about Linux
- Pirates of Silicon Valley
- Open source
- Linux
- Free software movement
- Copyleft
- The Cathedral and the Bazaar
