= Miguel de Icaza =

Mexican software developer (born 1972)

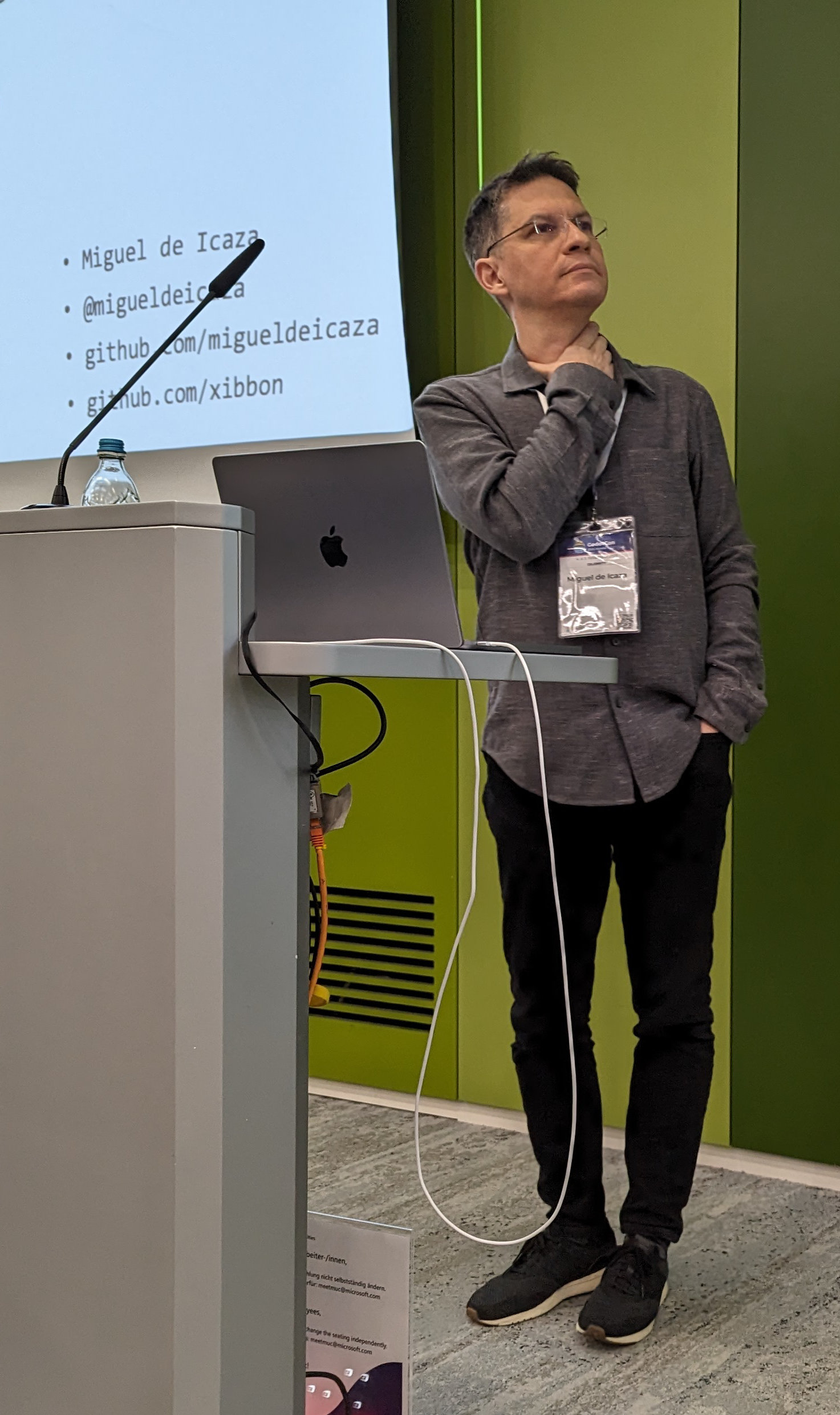
- De Icaza in 2023
- Born: November 23, 1972 (age 53); Mexico City, Mexico
- Citizenship: Mexican · American
- Education: National Autonomous University of Mexico (dropped out)
- Occupation: Software developer
- Title: Distinguished Engineer
- Spouse: Maria Laura Soares da Silva (m. 2003)
- Children: 3
- Website: tirania.org/blog

Miguel de Icaza (born November 23, 1972) is a Mexican-American programmer and activist, best known for starting the GNOME, Mono, and Xamarin projects.

== Biography ==
=== Early years ===
De Icaza was born in Mexico City and studied Mathematics at the National Autonomous University of Mexico (UNAM), but dropped out before getting a degree to work in IT. He came from a family of scientists in which his father is a physicist and his mother a biologist. He started writing free software in 1992.

=== Early software career ===
One of the earliest pieces of software he wrote for Linux was the Midnight Commander file manager in 1994, a text-mode file manager. He was also one of the early contributors to the Wine project.

He worked with David S. Miller on the Linux SPARC port and wrote several of the video and network drivers in the port, as well as the libc ports to the platform. They both later worked on extending Linux for MIPS to run on SGI's Indy computers and wrote the original X drivers for the system. With Ingo Molnár he wrote the original software implementation of RAID-1 and RAID-5 drivers of the Linux kernel.

In summer of 1997, he was interviewed by Microsoft for a job in the Internet Explorer Unix team (to work on a SPARC port), but lacked the university degree required to obtain a work H-1B visa. He said in an interview that he tried to persuade his interviewers to free the IE code even before Netscape did so with their own browser.

=== GNOME, Ximian, Xamarin and Mono ===
De Icaza started the GNOME project with Federico Mena in August 1997 to create a completely free desktop environment and component model for Linux and other Unix-like operating systems. He also created the GNOME spreadsheet program, Gnumeric.

In 1999, de Icaza, along with Nat Friedman, co-founded Helix Code, a GNOME-oriented free software company that employed a large number of other GNOME hackers. In 2001, Helix Code, later renamed Ximian, announced the Mono Project, to be led by de Icaza, with the goal to implement Microsoft's new .NET development platform on Linux and Unix-like platforms. In August 2003, Ximian was acquired by Novell. There, de Icaza was Vice President of Developer Platform.

In May 2011, de Icaza started Xamarin to replace MonoTouch and Mono for Android after Novell was bought by Attachmate and the projects were abandoned. Shortly afterwards, Xamarin and Novell reached an agreement where Xamarin took over the development and sales of these products.

In February 2016, Xamarin announced being acquired by Microsoft. One month later at the Microsoft Build conference, it was announced that the Mono Project would be relicensed to MIT, Visual Studio would include Xamarin (even the free versions) without restrictions, and Xamarin SDKs would be opensourced.

=== Advocacy of Microsoft open technologies ===
De Icaza endorsed Microsoft's Office Open XML (OOXML) document standard, disagreeing with a lot of the widespread criticism in the open source and free-software community.

He also developed Mono – a free and open-source alternative to Microsoft's .NET Framework – for GNOME. This has raised much disagreement due to the patents that Microsoft holds on the .NET Framework.

De Icaza was criticized by Richard Stallman on the Software Freedom Day 2009, who labeled him as "Traitor to the Free Software Community". Icaza responded on his blog to Stallman with the remark that he believes in a "world of possibility" and that he is open for discussions on ways to improve the pool of open source and free software.

=== Preference for Mac over Linux ===
In August 2012, de Icaza criticized the Linux desktop as "killed by Apple". De Icaza specifically criticized a generally developer-focused culture, lack of backward compatibility, and fragmentation among the various Linux distributions. In March 2013, de Icaza announced on his personal blog that he regularly used macOS instead of Linux for desktop computing.

=== .NET Foundation director ===
In 2014 he joined Anders Hejlsberg on stage during the announcements of the .NET Foundation and the open sourcing of Microsoft's C# Compiler. He went on to serve on the board of directors of the .NET Foundation.

=== Leaving Microsoft ===
In March 2022, he announced he was leaving Microsoft and taking some time off.

In May 2025, he officially launched Xogot at GodotCon Boston.

== Awards and recognition ==
Miguel de Icaza has received the Free Software Foundation 1999 Award for the Advancement of Free Software, the MIT Technology Review Innovator of the Year Award 1999, and was named one of Time magazine's 100 innovators for the new century in September 2000.

In early 2010 he received a Microsoft MVP Award.

In March 2010, he was named as the fifth in the "Most Powerful Voices in Open Source" by MindTouch.

== Personal life ==
De Icaza has had cameo appearances in the 2001 motion pictures Antitrust and The Code.

He married Maria Laura Soares da Silva (now Maria Laura de Icaza) in 2003. They have three children. He has been living in the state of Massachusetts for 20 years.

De Icaza and his wife are critical of the actions of the state of Israel towards the Palestinians in the Middle East and has blogged about the subject and visited the area of conflict as well.
