= Anina (model) =

American-born/Paris-based international fashion model/blogger

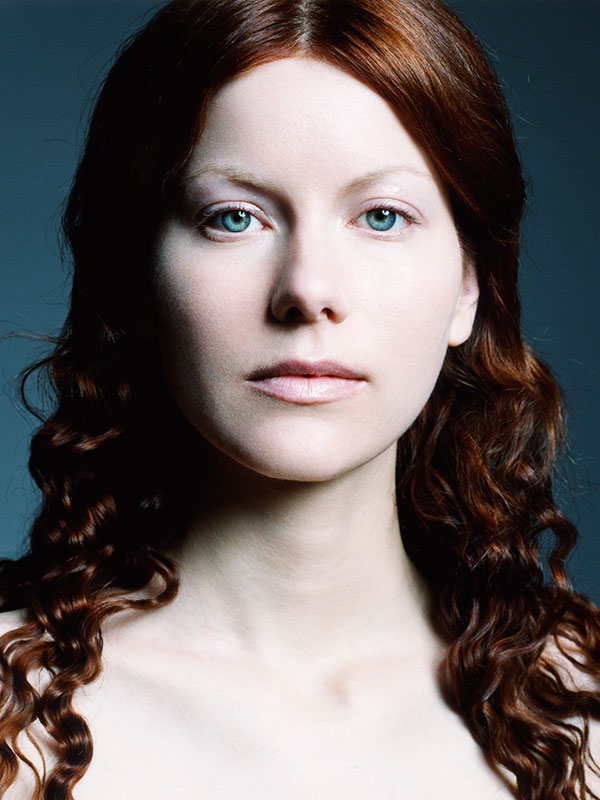
- Other name: Anina.net
- Occupations: fashion model, conference speaker, blogger, wearables developer, and event producer.
- Website: www.anina.net

Anina, also known by the pseudonym Anina Net, is an American-born German fashion model, conference speaker, blogger, wearables developer, and event producer. She was listed as number seven in the Top 100 Women in Wearable and Consumer Tech, and is the founder and CEO of 360Fashion Network.

Through 360Fashion Network, she collaborated with Intel on the development of Intel Curie-powered robotic dresses, and smart gloves used by 162 dancers in the CCTV Chinese New Year Gala performance "Spring Wind".

PBS profiled her in a documentary, including an interview with Robert X. Cringely for Nerd TV, where she appeared as the ninth guest and the first woman in the series on the future of mobile technology. She was also the subject of the CRI Radio documentary My China Life. In 2005, CNET described her as one of the notable figures at the Les Blogs 2.0 conference, writing "In blogs, and Anina, we trust."

== Career ==
=== Fashion model ===
Anina began her career as an international fashion model, working in major markets across Europe and Asia. Known for her distinctive red hair and tech-forward branding, she became one of the most recognizable foreign models in China during the 2000s. In 2009, she was named “China’s top foreign model” by China Central Television (CCTV). Her modeling portfolio includes runway appearances, editorial work, and campaigns for high-profile designers and brands. In parallel with her modeling work, Anina became one of the first fashion professionals to adopt blogging as a personal platform, attracting attention in the media and industry for combining modeling with early digital outreach. Her modeling experience later informed her work in fashion technology and performance-based projects.

=== Fashion technologist ===
In 2019, Anina and her company 360Fashion Network launched several initiatives linking fashion and technology, including the Diversity Meets Technology online summit at New York Fashion Week and robotic dresses presented at a Melange Fashion show. That same year, the Museum of Science and Industry (Chicago) featured 360Fashion Network's hot pink wireless charging wallet, designed by Anina and named after Sandy Carter, in its Wired to Wear exhibition of over 1000 wearable technologies. Her products, including the 360Fash Tech Kit and Smart Safety Ring, have also been showcased at the Target Open House in San Francisco, aimed at enabling fashion designers without coding or soldering skills to create smart garments and accessories.

Anina has presented her work at international events such as Wearable USA, FASHIONTECH Berlin, AVANTEX Paris, and the Mobile World Congress in Shanghai. She has also been active in China, where China Central Television named her "China’s top foreign model" in 2009, and she introduced products such as NFC cuffs and the anime-inspired "aninaMINEme" clothing line. Through 360Fashion Network, she continues to produce international expos, including the 360Fashion&Tech Expo in Asia, and the IBM 360Fashion Innovation Awards in the United States.

=== Movie actor ===
Anina expanded into acting alongside her work in fashion and technology, taking roles in both short films and international productions. Her acting credits include the feature film The Volunteers: To the War (2023), the television mini-series The Legend of the White Wolf (2024), and short films such as Be Faced (2024) and Lost (2016). She also appeared in The Wandering Earth 2 (2023) in the role of Sana Negar, although her scenes were ultimately cut from the final release. Her onscreen work often reflects her background in visual presentation and live performance, forming a natural progression from her modeling and fashion tech career.

Anina Net has become a leading advocate for the global expansion of Chinese short dramas, emphasizing both their commercial potential and creative possibilities. She has stated that Chinese short dramas hold vast investment opportunities as they move into overseas markets, and has highlighted how artificial intelligence can bring new narrative depth and expressive forms to the medium. She has also pointed to China's leadership in AI legal and regulatory frameworks as a factor supporting the international reach of short dramas. In addition, she has advocated for greater collaboration with female filmmakers, arguing that such partnerships can broaden perspectives and enhance the global appeal of Chinese short drama productions.

== Filmography ==
Year	Title	Role	Notes
2024	Be Faced	Julie Cohen	Short film
2024	The Legend of the White Wolf	Alison	TV Mini Series
2023	The Volunteers: To the War	Scarlett	Feature film
2023	The Wandering Earth 2	Sana Negar Space Engineer	Scenes deleted
2022	Film Analyst	Host	TV Series
2016	Lost	Mary	Short film
