= Rayne Kruger =

South African author and property developer

- Born: Charles Rayne Kruger; 29 January 1922; Queenstown, Cape Province, South Africa
- Died: 21 December 2002 (aged 80)
- Education: University of the Witwatersrand
- Occupations: Author and property developer
- Spouse(s): Nan Munro (m. 1947, divorced) Prue Leith (m. 1974)
- Children: 2, including Danny Kruger

Charles Rayne Kruger (29 January 1922 – 21 December 2002) was a South African author and property developer.

Charles Rayne Kruger was born on 29 January 1922 in Queenstown, in the eastern Cape Province, the son of an unmarried 17-year-old daughter of a British Army officer. As his father had disappeared, his mother married Victor Kruger, a Johannesburg estate agent. He was educated at Jeppe High School and the University of the Witwatersrand, but was sent down after an escapade with some donkeys and became an articled clerk in a law firm in Johannesburg. During the Second World War, his eyesight was too poor for him to get into one of the armed forces, but he served as a steward aboard a merchant ship, which gave him the material for his first book, Tanker. After the war, he qualified as a lawyer and joined a theatrical company.

Kruger's first wife was the actress Nan Munro, a widow, 16 years older than him, with three children, including John Gau. They later divorced, and he married the restaurateur, chef and television presenter Prue Leith. They had a son, the Conservative, and later Reform UK, MP Danny Kruger, and adopted a Cambodian daughter, Li-Da.

== Publications ==
- Tanker (novel), London: Longman's Green & Co, 1952
- The Spectacle (crime novel), London: Longman's Green & Co, 1953
- Young Villain With Wings (crime novel), London: Longman's Green & Co, 1953
- My Name is Celia (novel), London: Longman's Green & Co, 1954
- The Even Keel (crime novel), London: Longman's Green & Co, 1955
- Ferguson (crime novel), London: Longman's Green & Co, 1956
- Goodbye Dolly Gray: The Story of the Boer War (non-fiction), London: Cassell, 1959
- The Devil's Discus (non-fiction), London: Cassell, 1964
- All Under Heaven: A Complete History of China (non-fiction), Hoboken, New Jersey: John Wiley & Sons, 2003
