= Sandy Carter =

American computer scientist, marketer, and businesswoman

Sandra "Sandy" Carter
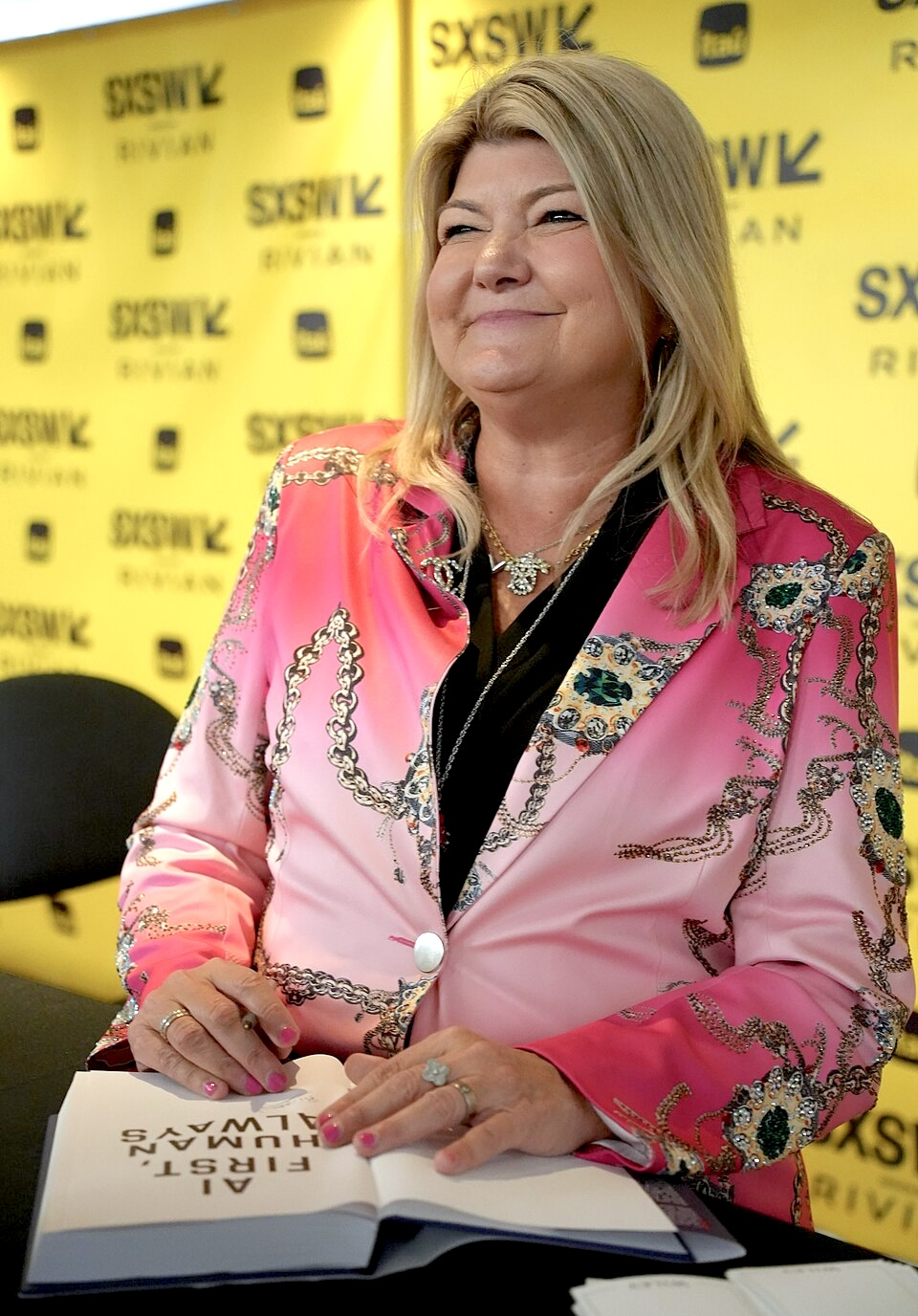
- Carter at SXSW 2025
- Education: Duke University, Harvard Business School
- Occupation: Chief Operating Officer
- Employer: Unstoppable Domains
- Children: 2
- Website: http://sandycarter.net/

Sandra “Sandy” Carter is an American businesswoman, speaker and author. She was a general manager at IBM from 2013 to 2016, vice president at Amazon Web Services from 2017 to 2021 and is currently the chief operating officer at Unstoppable Domains.

== Early life and education ==
Carter was born in the United States. She holds a Bachelor of Science in computer science from Duke University and an MBA from Harvard Business School. She has experience with eight programming languages.

== Career ==
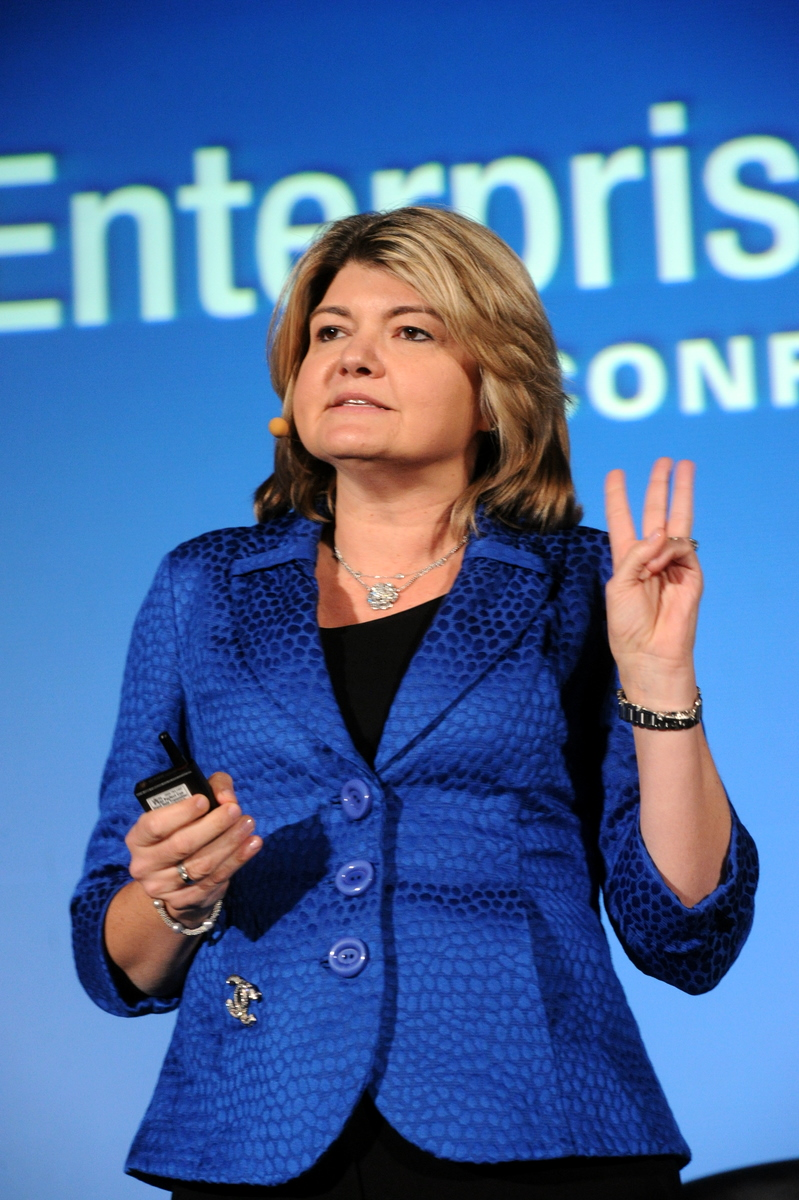
Carter at the Enterprise 2.0 Conference, 2011

From 2013 to 2016, Carter served as a general manager at IBM, where she was responsible for overseeing growth in the company’s AI cloud business units and integrating advanced technologies with traditional cloud services. In 2017, Carter joined Amazon Web Services (AWS) as a vice president, serving until 2021. She focused on enterprise marketing and innovation, contributing to the development of AI cloud services and global Go to market strategies.

In 2021, she joined Unstoppable Domains as Vice President of Business Development and Partnerships and was promoted to COO in 2023. At Unstoppable Domains, she has been instrumental in expanding partnerships in the Web3 space and promoting decentralized identity adoption.

== Speaking engagements and membership ==
Carter has delivered keynote addresses at global conferences, including SXSW, CES, Web Summit, and events organized by the World Economic Forum, speaking on topics such as innovation, Web3, artificial intelligence, and women in technology.

She is also a contributing writer to major publications such as Forbes and VentureBeat, where she covers emerging technologies, and leadership in the tech industry.

She was previously chairman of the board for the now-defunct non-profit organization Girls in Tech, and was an adjunct professor at Carnegie Mellon Silicon Valley. She serves on the Board of Directors at Altair, a company focused on AI and simulation. Sandy is also on the board for Authentrics, an AI startup, and CrowdGenAI, an AI startup, as well as on the board of Secret Network, developing Decentralized AI.

Sandra was previously a member of the advisory board of the Internet of Things Community. 360Fashion Network created a hot pink wireless charging wallet designed by Anina Net, and named "The Sandy" after Carter, which was displayed and sold at the Museum of Science and Industry Chicago's in 2019.

In 2025, Carter attended a dinner hosted by President Donald Trump at the Trump National Golf Club for the top 220 holders of his $TRUMP meme coin. The average attendee spent $1.8 million to attend the event, which Trump appeared at for 15 minutes.

== Recognition ==
- Top 5 Women in Technology
- "Top 3 Innovation Influencer" from SXSW (2017)
- "Brand Leader of the Year" from the "World Brand Congress" (2009)
- Fast Company "Most Influential 'Women' in Technology" (2009)
- Women in Technology Hall of Fame (2010)
- CNN Magazine "Ten most powerful women in tech"(2012)
- NAFE "Social Media Star" and "Woman of Excellence" (2012)
- Franz Edelman Laureate for Analytics Innovation
- Forbes’ “Global Top 40 Marketing Masters” list
- Top 100 Global Thought Leader by Awards Magazine (2022)
- Top 115 Most Inspirational Women of Web3/Metaverse/AI (2024)
- Microsoft MSN Top 10 AI Entrepreneur (2024)
- DappRadar Top 18 Women of Web3 (2025)
- Executive Women of GenAI (2025)
- Adweek’s AI Power 100 (2025)

== Selected publications ==
Carter has authored seven books “The New Language of Business: SOA & Web 2.0”; “The New Language of Marketing 2.0: Social Media”, which won the Silver Marketing Sherpa award in 2009; "Get Bold” in 2011; and "Extreme Innovation: 3 Superpowers for Purpose and Profit" released in 2017.

- "The New Language of Business: SOA & Web 2.0.", IBM Press, 2007, ISBN 0-13-195654-X
- "The New Language of Marketing 2.0: How to Use ANGELS to Energize Your Market", IBM Press, 2008, ISBN 978-0-13-714249-1
- "Get Bold: Using Social Media to Create a New Type of Social Business”, IBM Press, 2011 ISBN 0-13-261831-1
- "Extreme Innovation: 3 Superpowers for Purpose and Profit", Param Media, 2017 ISBN 0995030278, ISBN 978-0995030275
- "Geek Girls are Chic", e-book, 2015
- Tiger and the Rabbit 2024
- “AI First, Human Always: Embracing a New Mindset for the Era of Superintelligence”, Wiley, 2025
