= NerdTV =

- Genre: Interview Show
- Country of origin: United States
- Original language: English
- No. of seasons: 1
- No. of episodes: 13

Production
- Producer: PBS
- Running time: 30 minutes

Original release
- Network: PBS
- Release: September 6 – November 29, 2005

NerdTV was a technology TV show from PBS. NerdTV was not aired, instead each episode was released as a MPEG-4 video file, freely downloadable and licensed under a Creative Commons license. Transcripts and audio-only versions of the released episodes were available as well.

The show features Robert X. Cringely interviewing famous and influential nerds. Each episode was about one hour and features a single guest from the world of technology. From September 6, 2005 to November 29, 2005, thirteen episodes comprising Season One were released on the Internet. Another thirteen episodes were promised for Season Two, in which the show was renamed SuperNerds, along with a more consistent release schedule and better quality video files. Season Two was never created.

== Schedule ==
Date	Guest	Most remembered as	Archive.org Link
2005-09-06	Andy Hertzfeld	Macintosh operating system programmer	Watch
2005-09-13	Max Levchin	PayPal co-founder	Watch
2005-09-20	Bill Joy	Sun Microsystems co-founder	Watch
2005-09-27	Brewster Kahle	Internet Archive founder	Watch
2005-10-04	Tim O'Reilly	Internet publisher	Watch
2005-10-11	Dave Winer	Father of RSS	Watch
2005-10-18	Dan Drake	Autodesk co-founder	Watch
2005-10-25	Avram Miller	Intel Capital co-founder	Watch
2005-11-01	Anina	Mobile-oriented model	Watch
2005-11-08	Dan Bricklin	Spreadsheet inventor	Watch
2005-11-15	Doug Engelbart	Computer mouse inventor	Watch
2005-11-22	Bob Kahn	TCP/IP inventor	Watch
2005-11-29	Judy Estrin	Internet entrepreneur	Watch

== Episode highlights ==
=== NerdTV008 – Avram Miller ===
This episode is one of the first where the subject (Avram Miller) is not an entrepreneur, which is to say he didn't create a company that was successful, though he did facilitate many successful startup companies through his investment portfolio while at Intel. The show chronologically follows his career, including:

- Biotech (although the term didn't exist yet) experiences with brain-wave analysis.
- networked computer monitoring in the hospital environment in the mid-late 1960.
- starting & running a company in Israel at the end of the War of Attrition.
- working with Ken Olsen for Digital Equipment Corporation around the time of IBM's launch of the PC.
- to finally joining Intel and working with them to develop numerous new ideas and venture capitalist investments Intel Capital.

== Reception ==
Chin Wong of Manila Standard Today wrote, "An hour with a technology guru may be too much for nontechies, but for those with an abiding interest in the industry, NerdTV is must-see TV." In a mixed review, Wired's Jason Silverman stated, "Cringely will surely refine the show as the season progresses. One lesson from episode one: Turn off your cell phone. But without additional resources -- a second camera and an editor? a shiny round table? -- NerdTV is not likely to be an important moment in web TV history. Episode one will be of great interest to Mac cultists. But one imagines that PBS would prefer that the series reach beyond the small clique of hard-core geeks."
