= Cygnus Solutions =

American software company

- Industry: Computer software
- Founded: 1989; 37 years ago
- Founder: David Henkel-Wallace
- Defunct: 2000; 26 years ago
- Fate: Merged with Red Hat
- Successor: Red Hat
- Key people: John Gilmore, Michael Tiemann, and David Henkel-Wallace
- Products: Compilers, debuggers, development tools, eCos, Cygwin

Cygnus Solutions, originally Cygnus Support, was founded in 1989 by John Gilmore, Michael Tiemann and David Henkel-Wallace to provide commercial support for free software. Its tagline was: Making free software affordable.

For years, employees of Cygnus Solutions were the maintainers of several key GNU software products, including the GNU Debugger and GNU Binutils (which included the GNU Assembler and Linker). It was also a major contributor to the GCC project and drove the change in the project's management from having a single gatekeeper to having an independent committee. Cygnus developed BFD, and used it to help port GNU to many architectures, in a number of cases working under non-disclosure to produce tools used for initial bringup of software for a new chip design.

Cygnus was also the original developer of Cygwin, a POSIX layer and the GNU toolkit port to the Microsoft Windows operating system family, and of eCos, an embedded real-time operating system.

In the 2001 documentary film Revolution OS, Tiemann indicates that the name "Cygnus" was chosen from among several names that incorporated the acronym "GNU" such as "magnum", "wingnut", and "lugnut". According to Stan Kelly-Bootle, it was recursively defined as Cygnus, your GNU Support.

On November 15, 1999, Cygnus Solutions announced its merger with Red Hat, and it ceased to exist as a separate company in early 2000. As of 2007, a number of Cygnus employees continue to work for Red Hat, including Tiemann, who serves as Red Hat's Vice President of Open Source Affairs, and formerly served as CTO.
