= Nan Munro =

South African-born British actress, director and producer

- Born: Anne Mackay Munro; 24 June 1905; Piet Potgietersrust, South Africa
- Died: 1992 (aged 86–87)
- Education: Royal Academy of Dramatic Art
- Occupations: Actress; director; producer
- Spouse(s): Cullis William "Bill" Gau (died 1945) Rayne Kruger (m. 1947)
- Children: 3, including John Gau

Anne Mackay "Nan" Munro (24 June 1905 – 1992) was a South African-born British actress, director and producer.

Anne Mackay Munro was born in Piet Potgietersrust, South Africa on 24 June 1905.

She studied at the Royal Academy of Dramatic Art (RADA) in London and graduated in 1932.

She married engineer Cullis William "Bill" Gau, and they had three children, Donald, John and Angela. Gau died in 1945, and in 1947, she married Rayne Kruger, who was 16 years younger than her.

She died in 1992.

== Filmography (selected) ==
- Offbeat 1961, as Sarah Bennett
- Morgan – A Suitable Case for Treatment 1966, as Mrs. Henderson
- Games That Lovers Play 1971, as Lady Evelyn Chatterley

== Television (selected) ==
- David Copperfield 1966, as Lavinia Spenlow
- The Whitehall Worrier 1967, as Miss Dempster
- Budgie 1971–1972, as Mrs Beecham
