= The Whitehall Worrier =

1967 British TV comedy series

- Genre: Comedy
- Written by: Alan Melville
- Starring: Robert Coote; Moira Lister; Jonathan Cecil
- Composer: Dennis Wilson
- Country of origin: United Kingdom
- Original language: English
- No. of series: 1
- No. of episodes: 7

Production
- Producer: Graeme Muir
- Running time: 30 minutes
- Production company: BBC

Original release
- Network: BBC 1
- Release: 6 January – 17 February 1967

The Whitehall Worrier is a British comedy television series which first aired on BBC One in 1967. Revolving around the career of one of the minister's in Harold Wilson's Labour government, the series was gentle in style and closer to a traditional farce than more contemporary satire.

All episodes are now considered to be lost.

== Main cast ==
- Robert Coote as Rt. Hon. Mervyn Pugh
- Moira Lister as Janet Pugh
- Jonathan Cecil as Roger Deere
- Nan Munro as Miss Dempster
- Arthur Howard as Mr. Harrison
- Barbara Ogilvie as Mrs. Frome
- Karl Lanchbury as David Pugh
- Daphne Anderson as Mrs. Nicholson

== Bibliography ==
- Steven Fielding. A State of Play: British Politics on Screen, Stage and Page, from Anthony Trollope to The Thick of It. A&C Black, 2014.
