= Computer Networks: The Heralds of Resource Sharing =

1972 documentary film

- Directed by: Peter Chvany
- Release date: 1972

Computer Networks: The Heralds of Resource Sharing is a short documentary film from 1972, produced by Steven King and directed/edited by Peter Chvany, about ARPANET, an early packet-switching network and one of the first networks to implement the protocol suite TCP/IP.

== Content ==
The 30 minute film features many of the most important names in computer networking, especially J. C. R. Licklider and others from MIT's Project MAC who had connected a computer to ARPANET the year before. According to a history of computing equipment by Columbia University it "begins with a montage of equipment ... and then has interviews with ARPANET creators." The film discusses "the potential that this network has for revolutionizing so many industries and institutions". Bob Kahn presents concepts originally published by Donald Davies at the inaugural Symposium on Operating Systems Principles, which were being implemented in the ARPANET.

=== Participants ===
Speaking parts:

- Fernando J. Corbató (Corby): (voice 0:45-1:15, face 1:00-1:15, 15:10-15:40) Turing Award winner, implementer of multitasking operating systems.
- J. C. R. Licklider (Lick): (1:00-1:40), and many times throughout the film. Licklider discusses how, despite the invention of the printing press being a revolution, the transmission of information on paper was slow. He also discusses collaboration, access to digital libraries, the transition to electronic information and the social processes involved in this.
- Lawrence G. Roberts: (voice 1:40-2:25) SIGCOMM Award winner.
- Robert Kahn: (2:25-2:35, 3:15-6:25, 6:55-) Turing Award winner.
- Frank Heart: (2:35-3:15, 6:25-6:55)
- William R. Sutherland (Bert): (13:50-15:10)
- Richard W. Watson: (17:34-18:30, 25:05-25:15) mass storage researcher
- John R. Pasta: (18:30-19:25)
- Donald W. Davies: (19:25-21:55) packet switching inventor.
- George W. Mitchell: (21:55-24:05, voice only)

Non-speaking:

- Daniel L. Murphy: (Behind the titles, several other times including about 15:44)

Unidentified:

- (8:27-8:32, with beard and glasses): previously misidentified as Jon Postel

== Reception ==
Cory Doctorow called the documentary a "fantastic 30 minutes of paleo-nerd memorabilia". Matt Novak of Gizmodo said "When you hear a man like J.C.R. Licklider describe the information age before it had even begun to trickle into the public consciousness, we understand how forward-thinking these people developing the ARPANET in the late 1960s and early 1970s truly were." Mark Liberman described it as "amazing".

== See also ==
- History of the Internet
- List of Internet pioneers
- Nerds 2.0.1 – 1998 documentary about the development of the ARPANET, the Internet, and the World Wide Web
- Protocol Wars
- Resource sharing
