= The Devil's Discus =

Book by Rayne Kruger

- Author: Rayne Kruger
- Language: English
- Subject: Crime, Politics, Psychology, History
- Genre: Non-fiction
- Publisher: Cassell & Co., Ltd.
- Publication date: 1964, Second Edition 2009
- Publication place: England
- Media type: Print Hardcover/Paperback (Second Edition)
- Pages: 260 p.
- ISBN: 978-988-97752-5-4 (Paperback, Second Edition)

The Devil's Discus is an investigation into the death of King Ananda Mahidol (Rama VIII) of Siam (later Thailand) by English-South African author Rayne Kruger.

== Book summary ==
The book is divided into four main sections, each of which is further divided into chapters. The section "Before" serves as an introduction to King Ananda's death, to Siam, and to King Ananda's background.

The next section, "The Life and Death of Ananda," is ten chapters long and describes the major events of King Ananda's life, from his birth in Heidelberg in 1925 to his death by a single gunshot under mysterious circumstances at the Royal Palace in Bangkok on June 9, 1946. This section introduces the main characters who surrounded Ananda during his life and who became subjects of investigation after his death.

The third section, "The Trial," has eight chapters and summarizes the events and arguments of the subsequent regicide trial of three palace officials, including two appeals, which lasted more than six years and resulted in the execution of all three defendants in 1955.

The final section, "Who Killed Ananda?" is Kruger's own analysis of the evidence surrounding Ananda's death, which leads him to conclude that the only satisfactory explanation is suicide. He supports this theory with the revelation of a love affair between the young king and a fellow law student in Switzerland, Marylene Ferrari, a relationship that would have been unacceptable to Siam's royalist institutions.

== Publication history ==
The Devil's Discus was first published in 1964 by Cassell. The Thai government banned the book as soon as it was published and Kruger was banned from further entry to Thailand.

A Thai translation of the book titled Kongchak Pisat (Thai: กงจักรปีศาจ) by Chalit Chaisithiwet (Thai: ร.อ.ชลิต ชัยสิทธิเวช) was produced for submission as evidence in a 1970 defamation lawsuit brought by Pridi Banomyong against MR Kukrit Pramoj and his newspaper Siam Rath. The translator was the elder brother of Pridi's secretary, Vacharachai Chaisithiwet. It was secretly published by two Thammasat students in 1974 and reprinted in 1977, and circulated behind closed doors in Thailand. A local printing house involved with this Thai edition was burnt down. This translation was eventually officially banned in May 2006. In 2016, the Supreme Court of Thailand ruled that selling this book constituted an offence of lèse-majesté under section 112 of the Thai Penal Code and sentenced a 67-year-old man to two-year imprisonment on account thereof.

Through the organisation Freedom Against Censorship Thailand (FACT), the English text was reprinted in November 2009 by DMP Publications, Hong Kong.

== Critical discussion ==
In 2011, journalist Andrew MacGregor Marshall published an online article in which he describes the genesis of The Devil's Discus: "Krueger wrote it on the suggestion of Prince Subhasvasti, brother of Prajadhipok’s wife Queen Rambhai..... [Subhasvasti] came to trust and respect Pridi as a result of their wartime cooperation...... He believed – that Pridi did something to do with Ananda’s death. The Devil’s Discus was envisaged as a way of rehabilitating Pridi’s reputation in the hope that he would be able to return from exile and play a leading role in Thai politics once again."

Marshall's view is that an explanation of Ananda's death is by Pridi, hence he goes on to say "Krueger’s book, published in 1964 after extensive research and considerable assistance from Subhasvasti, in his opinion had the purpose of demolishing the case against Pridi. The problem was that an alternative explanation for Ananda’s death had to be provided. And to conclude that Bhumibol was responsible was, of course, totally unacceptable to the royalist establishment – the book was supposed to enable détente between Rama IX and Pridi, not to declare full-scale war. So Krueger had to find a way to discard the likeliest explanation – that Bhumibol shot his brother – and promote the only credible alternative conclusion, suicide."

== See also ==
- Censorship in Thailand
