= Nerds 2.0.1 =

1998 PBS television documentary

- Also known as: Nerds 2.0.1: A Brief History of the Internet
- Genre: Documentary
- Written by: Robert X. Cringely, John Gau, and Stephen Segaller
- Directed by: Stephen Segaller
- Narrated by: Robert X. Cringely
- Theme music composer: Michael Bard
- Country of origin: United States
- Original language: English

Production
- Producers: Robert X. Cringely, John Gau, and Stephen Segaller
- Cinematography: Greg Bond, Wendy Revak, Brett Wood
- Editor: Bruce Barrow
- Running time: 150 minutes
- Production company: John Gau Productions for Oregon Public Broadcasting

Original release
- Network: Channel 4/PBS
- Release: September 19 – October 3, 1998

Related
- Triumph of the Nerds

Nerds 2.0.1: A Brief History of the Internet – also known as Glory of the Geeks – is a 1998 American PBS television documentary that explores the development of the ARPANET, the Internet, and the World Wide Web from 1969 to 1998. It was created during the dot-com boom of the late 1990s. The documentary was hosted and co-written by Robert X. Cringely (Mark Stephens), and is the sequel to the 1996 documentary, Triumph of the Nerds. It was first broadcast as Glory of the Geeks in three episodes on Channel 4 in the United Kingdom, and as Nerds 2.0.1 by PBS in the United States.

== Production ==
The documentary has three segments. The segment Networking the Nerds is about the professionals who worked to expand the ARPANET since the 1960s and internet advances by the United States government. Connecting the Suits details the founders of 3Com, Novell, and Cisco Systems. The last segment, Wiring the World, is about the history of the World Wide Web. Apple Inc. founder Steve Jobs is among those featured in the documentary. The documentary aired in 1998 on PBS and Channel 4. It aired on the Australian television channel Ovation in 2002.

== Reception ==
David Weinston of the journal Journalism History said, "As on his earlier PBS history of the personal computer, Triumph of the Nerds (1996), Cringely's whimsical narration, quick edits, varied music, hand-held camera moves, and animated graphics keep Nerds 2.0.1 funny, fast moving and unpredictable." Charles Ashbacher wrote in the journal Mathematics and Computer Education, "In this tape, Cringely and company get the background of the Internet right, and this is a tape that should be in all libraries, public and institutional." Scott Ellis said in a review of the documentary's 2002 Australian television broadcast that "it's a very informative and funny run through who was responsible for the great ideas – or who just fluked an advance that changed our world and gave us the net."

Nigerian computer scientist Philip Emeagwali wrote a criticism of the documentary's website listing 48 white males out of 50 internet pioneers, with none of them being black. Emeagwali said, "Since white males control the media, 96 percent of the Internet pioneers were white males. The documentary Nerds 2.0.1 reminded me of the African proverb: 'Only when lions have historians will hunters cease to be heroes.'"

== Book ==
The documentary led to the publication of a 1998 book by director Stephen Segaller with the same title. The book has four sections that detail the development of the internet during the 1960s to 1998. Each interview was combined to create a historical narrative flow throughout the book. Its setup is similar to a documentary. Jim Trageser of the American Reporter said that "entire swaths of the history of the Internet, and the online world in general, are missing from this book" such as "the omission of the BBS phenomenon."

C. Kock of Choice Reviews said, "Segaller has managed to offer an entertaining and very detailed picture of the world of the "nerds and geeks," as he refers to those whom he considers responsible for the commercial and communication monolith called the Internet." A Publishers Weekly review says, "Whether you call the pioneers it portrays ''nerds'' or any other name, Segaller's book makes an impressive argument for their significance."

== Home video ==
The documentary was released in a three-VHS tape set. A legal off-air recording of the documentary was released on DVD by DECS Tape Services.

== See also ==
- Computer Networks: The Heralds of Resource Sharing – 1972 documentary about the ARPANET
- History of the Internet
- History of the World Wide Web
- History of email
- List of Internet pioneers
