= Michael Tiemann =

American executive, software developer, and open source proponent

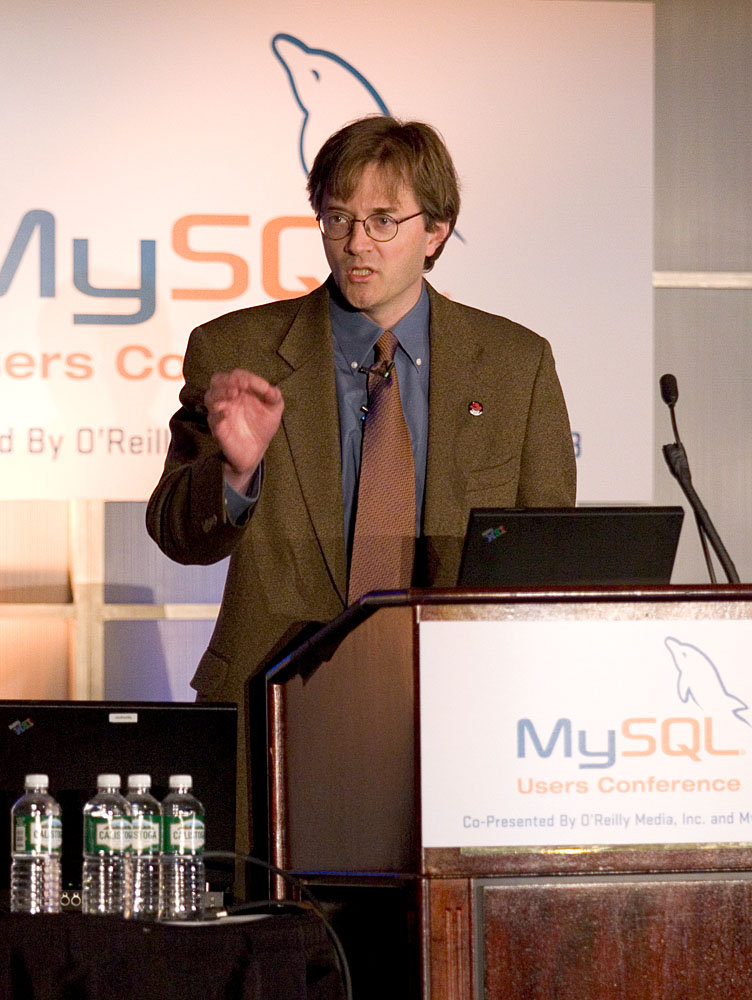
- Michael Tiemann at MySQL Conference 05 in 2005
- Education: Bachelor's degree
- Alma mater: Moore School of Electrical Engineering; University of Pennsylvania
- Occupations: Software developer, executive
- Known for: Co-founding Cygnus Solutions; authoring the GNU C++ compiler

Michael Tiemann is an American software developer and executive, who served as CTO at Red Hat and later vice-president of open source affairs beginning in 2004. He is also a former President of the Open Source Initiative.

== Biography ==
He earned a bachelor's degree from the Moore School of Electrical Engineering in 1986 at the University of Pennsylvania.

He co-founded Cygnus Solutions in 1989 and sold it to Red Hat for $697 million in 1999. His programming contributions to free software include authorship of the GNU C++ compiler and work on the GNU C compiler and the GNU Debugger. Tiemann is featured in the 2001 documentary Revolution OS. Opensource.com profiled him in 2014, calling him one of "open source's great explainers."

He was the chief technical officer of Red Hat. He served on a number of boards, including the Embedded Linux Consortium, the GNOME Foundation advisory board, and the board of directors of ActiveState Tool Corp.
