= Accidental Empires =

1992/1996 nonfiction book by Robert X. Cringely

- Revised edition (1996)
- Author: Mark Stephens (as Robert X. Cringely)
- Language: English
- Subject: Computer industry
- Publisher: Addison-Wesley Publishing Company, Inc.
- Publication date: February 1992
- Publication place: United States
- Media type: Print (Hardcover, Paperback)
- Pages: 324
- ISBN: 978-0-201-57032-8
- OCLC: 24141993
- Dewey Decimal: 338.4/7004/0979473 20ca
- LC Class: HD9696.C63 U51586 1991

Accidental Empires: How the Boys of Silicon Valley Make Their Millions, Battle Foreign Competition, and Still Can't Get a Date (1992, 1996), is a book written by Mark Stephens under the pen name Robert X. Cringely about the founding of the personal computer industry and the history of Silicon Valley.

The style of Accidental Empires is informal, and in the first chapter Cringely claims that he is not a historian but an explainer, and that "historians have a harder job because they can be faulted for what is left out; explainers like me can get away with printing only the juicy parts." Notably, the book was critical of Steve Jobs and Apple, as well as Bill Gates and Microsoft. The book described how companies in the technology industry were built and critiqued the public-relation campaigns that explained such narratives.

The book was revised and republished in 1996, with new material added. A documentary based on the book, called Triumph of the Nerds: The Rise of Accidental Empires was aired on PBS in 1996, with Cringely as the presenter. In November 2011, a film based on the miniseries called Steve Jobs: The Lost Interview, was exhibited at the Landmark Theatres. It included the missing footage of the interview that Jobs did with Cringely in 1995 for the PBS documentary.

In February 2012, Cringely wrote on his blog that he will republish the book online, free for all to read.

== Release details ==
- 1991, United States, Addison-Wesley Publishing Company, Inc ISBN 978-0-441-00652-6, Pub date February 1992 Hardback
- 1993, United States, HarperCollins ISBN 978-0-88730-621-1, Pub date February 1993, Paperback
- 1996, United States, HarperCollins ISBN 978-0-88730-855-0, Pub date October 23, 1996, Hardback
- 1996, United States, Penguin Books Ltd ISBN 978-0-14-025826-4, Pub date April 4, 1996, Paperback
