= Steve Jobs: The Lost Interview =

- Film poster
- Directed by: Paul Sen
- Written by: Robert X. Cringely
- Produced by: Paul Sen, John Gau, Stephen Segaller
- Starring: Steve Jobs
- Cinematography: John Booth, Clayton Moore
- Edited by: Nic Stacey
- Release date: May 11, 2012
- Running time: 70 minutes
- Country: United States
- Language: English

Steve Jobs: The Lost Interview is a documentary released to theaters in 2012. It consists of the original 70 minute interview that Steve Jobs gave to Robert X. Cringely in 1995 for the PBS documentary, Triumph of the Nerds. The name is due to it being considered lost media between 1995 and 2011.

== Background ==
The original interview that Jobs gave to Cringely for Triumph of the Nerds lasted about 70 minutes. Of those 70 minutes, only about 10 were used in Triumph of the Nerds. When Jobs gave this interview in 1995, he was still "two years away from retaking the Chief Executive role at Apple and beginning a run that would transform the Cupertino, Calif.-based Mac maker from loser to leader in the digital economy. At the time of the interview Jobs was one such loser himself: his company, NeXT was stumbling, and rival Bill Gates had taken Apple's ideas and used them to seize control of the personal computer industry."

According to Cringely the original videotape on D-1 was lost in shipping in 1995. When Steve Jobs died in 2011, Triumph of the Nerds director Paul Sen found in his garage a PAL VHS copy of the original unedited interview. Sen informed Cringely that he found this copy and discussed the possibility of releasing it as an independent film. Cringely then contacted Landmark Theatres co-owner Mark Cuban to see if a screening would be possible. Dubbed The Lost Interview, the 70 minute interview screened at 17 theaters around the United States and was later released on DVD in 2012.

== Critical response ==
The Lost Interview received a 100% rating from Rotten Tomatoes (6 fresh reviews). Robert Koehler of Variety describes it as Jobs at "40, and with an outlook of observing Apple from afar (he had been booted out of the company by Sculley a decade prior and had subsequently founded NeXT)." He is thus "able to bring a perspective he couldn't have provided at a younger age. Moreover, this p.o.v. [sic] wouldn't have been possible soon after the interview, since Jobs sold NeXT to Apple six months later and became Apple CEO a year after that." Roger Ebert gave it three stars and noted that "it's raw material for a film, in the form of Jobs speaking in close-up. It's a tribute to the singular popularity of Steve Jobs that he's probably the only talking head people would pay to watch for more than an hour."

== See also ==
- Triumph of the Nerds
