= Steve Jobs (clothing company) =

Italian clothing company

Company logo

Steve Jobs is an Italian clothing and fashion accessories company based in Naples, Italy, founded in 2012. It was created by brothers Vincenzo Barbato and Giacomo Barbato, originally from Arzano, a town approximately 9 kilometres (5.6 mi) north of Naples. Both brothers had previously worked in the fashion industry as designers for other brands before launching their own label. The company produces jeans, t-shirts, bags, and other apparel under a Made in Italy positioning, and has expressed plans to expand into consumer electronics in the future.

== History ==
When searching for a marketable name for their new company, the Barbato brothers discovered that Apple Inc. had never registered "Steve Jobs" as a trademark, despite it being the name of its iconic co-founder, who had died in October 2011. Inspired by Steve Jobs as what they described as "the innovator par excellence," they registered the trademark in 2012.

Alongside the brand name, the brothers designed a logo consisting of a stylized letter "J" — with bites taken out of each side and topped with a leaf — deliberately evoking Apple's own bitten apple insignia.

== Legal issues ==
Shortly after the trademark registration, Apple Inc. initiated legal proceedings against the Barbato brothers, sending what the brothers described as "four large folders of legal documents directly from Apple's headquarters in Cupertino." Apple's challenge focused particularly on the company's logo, which it argued was confusingly similar to its own trademark.

In August 2014, the European Union Intellectual Property Office (EUIPO) — then known as the Office for Harmonisation in the Internal Market (OHIM) — ruled entirely in favor of the Barbato brothers, rejecting Apple's opposition. The EUIPO reasoned that since the letter "J" is not edible, the missing piece from the logo could not legally be perceived as a "bite" and therefore could not constitute a trademark infringement. The ruling was summarized as: "The opposition is rejected in its entirety."

Although the legal outcome was determined in 2014, the Barbato brothers were unable to publicly discuss the case until 2017, when their full claim on the brand was definitively settled. The conclusion of the dispute attracted widespread international media coverage.

== Products ==
The company produces clothing and fashion accessories including jeans, t-shirts, bags, and other apparel. The brand is positioned as a Made in Italy fashion label.

== Future plans ==
Vincenzo and Giacomo Barbato have stated their intention to expand the "Steve Jobs" brand beyond fashion and into the technology sector, with a goal of producing innovative consumer electronics. Reports have specifically mentioned the possibility of an Android-based smartphone carrying the "Steve Jobs" brand name.
