= Larry Augustin =

American company founder (born 1962)

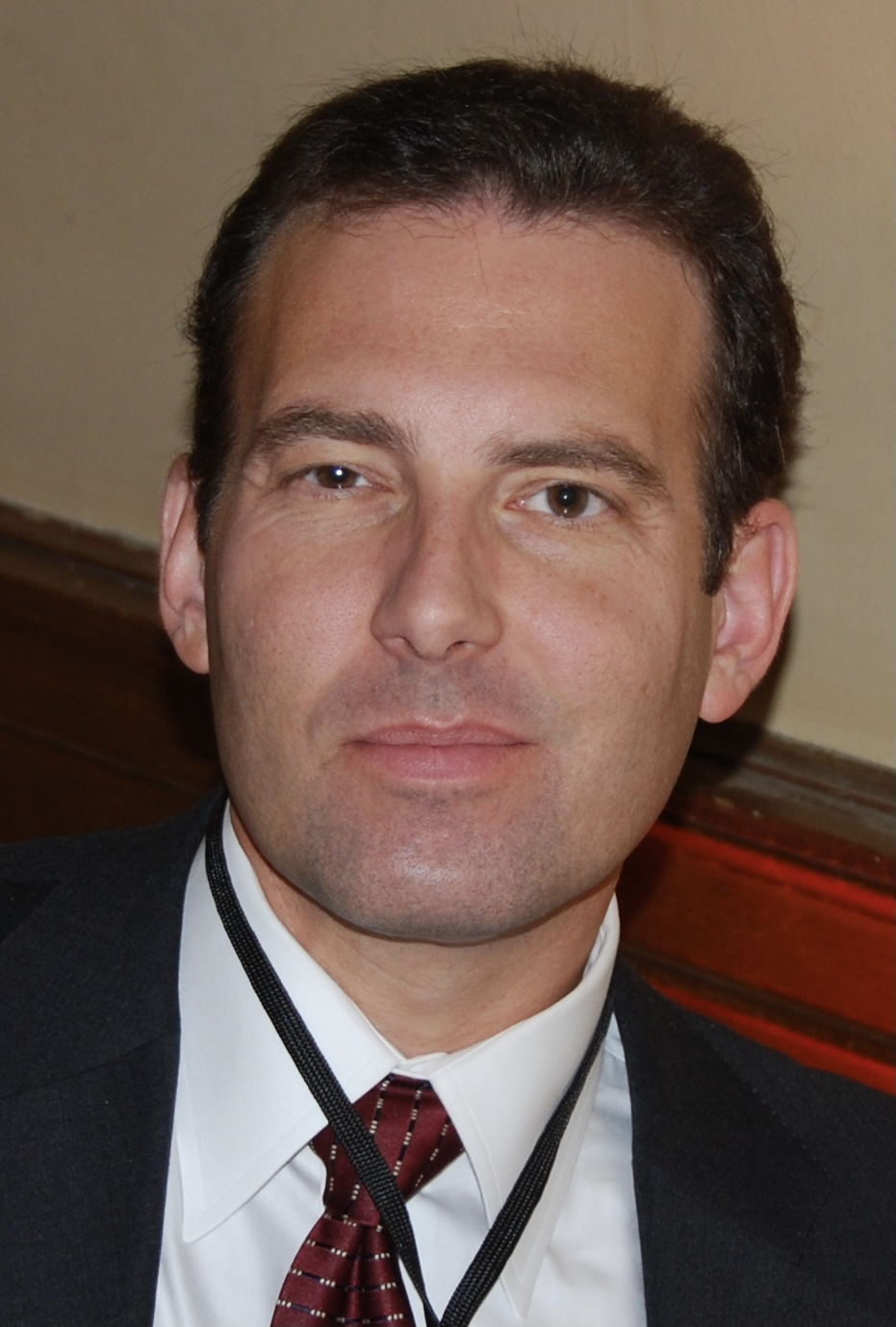
- Augustin in 2008
- Born: October 10, 1962 (age 64)
- Education: University of Notre Dame; Stanford University
- Known for: Chairman of SugarCRM; Founder of Geeknet; Paper billionaire during the dot-com bubble

Larry Augustin (born October 10, 1962) is a former VP at Amazon Web Services. He formerly was the chairman of the board of directors of SugarCRM. He is a former venture capitalist and the founder of VA Research (later Geeknet). During the height of the dot-com bubble, Augustin was a billionaire on paper at the age of 38.

Augustin is featured in the 2001 documentary film Revolution OS.

== Early life and education ==
Augustin grew up in a suburb of Dayton, Ohio, though he spent some of his early life on a family farm in New Hampshire.

After receiving a B.S. in electrical engineering from the University of Notre Dame, Augustin received a fellowship from Bell Labs to pursue a master's degree in electrical engineering from Stanford University. He went to work for Bell Labs for a year and then returned to Stanford to pursue a PhD.

== Career ==
In 1993, Augustin founded VA Research (later VA Linux and Geeknet), while a Ph.D. student at Stanford. Augustin was a Stanford colleague of Jerry Yang and David Filo, the founders of Yahoo!. Filo and Yang introduced Augustin to Sequoia Capital, which provided Augustin with venture capital.

In November 1999, he launched SourceForge, a collaborative development environment or "forge".

On December 9, 1999, during the dot-com bubble, VA Linux became a public company via an initial public offering and Augustin, then 38-years old, became a billionaire on paper.

In August 2002, Augustin left VA Linux and from September 2002 to December 2004, he was a partner at Azure Capital Partners, where he helped lead Azure's investments in Zend Technologies and Medsphere.

In 2005, Augustin joined the board of directors of SugarCRM and in May 2009, Augustin was appointed as the chief executive officer.

Augustin was the CEO of SugarCRM until February 2019 when Craig Charlton was appointed the role, with. Augustin remaining the chairman of the board of directors.

In July 2019, Augustin became a VP at Amazon Web Services. He left Amazon in 2021.

== Personal life ==
Augustin is married and has a daughter who was born in 1997.
