= The Little Kingdom =

1984 book by Michael Moritz

The Little Kingdom: The Private Story of Apple Computer
- Author: Michael Moritz
- Language: English
- Publisher: William Morrow & Co
- Publication date: 1984
- Publication place: United States
- Media type: Print (hardcover)
- ISBN: 978-0688039738

The Little Kingdom: The Private Story of Apple Computer is the first book that documented the development of Apple Computer. It was published in 1984 and written by then-Time Magazine reporter Michael Moritz. While Steve Jobs initially cooperated with Moritz, he ended communication in the middle of the project and did not authorize the published final version. Moritz reissued an updated version of the book in 2009 as Return to the Little Kingdom: Steve Jobs, the Creation of Apple, and How It Changed the World.

Jobs contracted Moritz in the early 1980s to document the development of the Macintosh for a book he was writing about Apple. According to Andy Hertzfeld, Jobs stated that "Mike's going to be our historian," a comment made in response to a published history in the previous year of another computer company. As he was close in age to many on the development team, he seemed to be a good choice. By late 1982, Moritz was Time Magazine's San Francisco Bureau Chief and working on the special Time Person of the Year issue. His work on that issue (which was initially supposed to be about Jobs) included a lengthy interview with Jobs' high school girlfriend, Chrisann Brennan, in which she discussed the history of their child, Lisa. Moritz's follow up interview with Jobs on the subject led to denial of paternity on his part. The issue also contained negative commentary on Jobs from other Apple employees.

The special issue was later renamed Machine of the Year prior to publication, celebrated The Computer and declared that, "it would have been possible to single out as Man of the Year one of the engineers or entrepreneurs who masterminded this technological revolution, but no one person has clearly dominated those turbulent events. More important, such a selection would obscure the main point. TIME's Man of the Year for 1982, the greatest influence for good or evil, is not a man at all. It is a machine: the computer." Jobs cut off all ties with Moritz after the issue was published and threatened to fire anyone who communicated with him. According to Hertzfeld, "some of us talked with Mike again surreptitiously, as he was putting the finishing touches on his book around the time of the Mac introduction" and the resulting text, The Little Kingdom, "remains one of the best books about Apple Computer ever written."

In the Prologue to Return to the Little Kingdom: Steve Jobs, the Creation of Apple, and How It Changed the World (the 2009 updated reissue of The Little Kingdom) Moritz states that he was as incensed as Jobs was about the Time Magazine special issue: "Steve rightly took umbrage over his portrayal and what he saw as a grotesque betrayal of confidences, while I was equally distraught by the way in which material I had arduously gathered for a book about Apple was siphoned, filtered, and poisoned with a gossipy benzene by an editor in New York whose regular task was to chronicle the wayward world of rock-and-roll music. Steve made no secret of his anger and left a torrent of messages on the answering machine I kept in my converted earthquake cottage at the foot of San Francisco’s Potrero Hill. He, understandably, banished me from Apple and forbade anyone in his orbit to talk to me. The experience made me decide that I would never again work anywhere I could not exert a large amount of control over my own destiny or where I would be paid by the word. I finished my leave [and] published my book, The Little Kingdom: The Private Story of Apple Computer, which I felt, unlike the unfortunate magazine article, presented a balanced portrait of the young Steve Jobs."
