= Michael Moritz =

Welsh venture capitalist

Sir Michael Moritz KBE
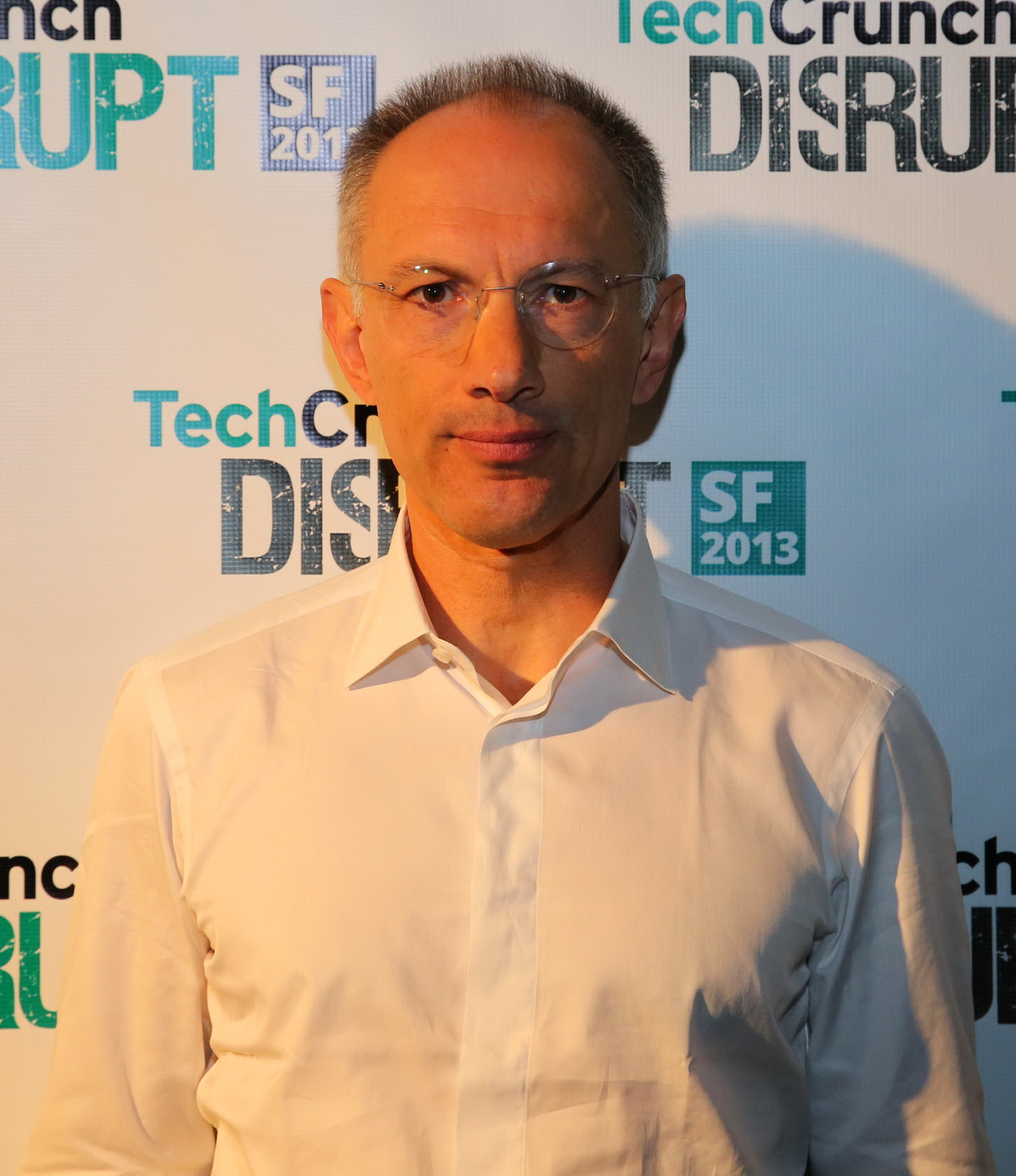
- Moritz in 2013
- Born: Michael Jonathan Moritz; 12 September 1954 (age 72); Cardiff, Wales
- Citizenship: United Kingdom, United States
- Education: University of Oxford (BA); University of Pennsylvania (MBA)
- Occupation: Venture capitalist
- Known for: Former Partner at Sequoia Capital
- Spouse: Harriet Heyman
- Children: 2

Sir Michael Jonathan Moritz (born 12 September 1954) is a Welsh billionaire venture capitalist, philanthropist, author, and former journalist. Moritz works for Sequoia Capital, wrote the first history of Apple Inc., The Little Kingdom, and authored Going for Broke: Lee Iacocca's Battle to Save Chrysler. Previously, Moritz was a staff writer at Time magazine and a member of the board of directors of Google. He studied at the University of Oxford and the Wharton School of the University of Pennsylvania where he was a Thouron Scholar, and went on to found Technologic Partners before becoming a venture capitalist in the 1980s. Moritz was named as the No. 1 venture capitalist on the Forbes Midas List in 2006 and 2007.

== Early life and education ==
Michael Jonathan Moritz was born to a Jewish family in Cardiff, Wales, on 12 September 1954. His father, Ludwig Alfred Moritz (1921–2003), was a Jew who fled Nazi Germany, and became a professor of Classics and, later, Vice Principal at Cardiff University. His mother, Doris (née Rath; 1924–2019), also fled Nazi Germany. Moritz attended Howardian High School in Cardiff.

Moritz earned a bachelor's degree in history at Christ Church, Oxford and, in 1978, an MBA from the Wharton School of the University of Pennsylvania as a Thouron scholar.

== Career ==
=== Journalist ===
Moritz first worked for many years as a journalist. In the early 1980s, when he was a reporter for Time, Steve Jobs contracted him to document the development of the Mac for a book he was writing about Apple. According to Andy Hertzfeld, in response to the fact that a history of another computer company had been published a year earlier, Jobs said: "Mike's going to be our historian." As he was close in age to many on the development team, he seemed to be a good choice.

By late 1982, Moritz was Time's San Francisco Bureau Chief and working on the special Time Person of the Year issue, which, according to Jobs, was initially supposed to be about him. His research included a lengthy interview with Jobs' high school girlfriend, Chrisann Brennan, in which she discussed the history of their child, Lisa. Moritz's follow-up interview with Jobs on the subject led to denial of paternity on his part. The issue also contained negative commentary on Jobs from other Apple employees. The special issue was renamed Machine of the Year prior to publication, celebrated The Computer and declared that "it would have been possible to single out as Man of the Year one of the engineers or entrepreneurs who masterminded this technological revolution, but no one person has clearly dominated those turbulent events. More important, such a selection would obscure the main point. TIME's Man of the Year for 1982, the greatest influence for good or evil, is not a man at all. It is a machine: the computer." Jobs cut off all ties with Moritz after the issue was published and threatened to fire anyone who communicated with him. According to Hertzfeld, "some of us talked with Mike again surreptitiously, as he was putting the finishing touches on his book around the time of the Mac introduction" and the resulting text, The Little Kingdom: the Private Story of Apple Computer, "remains one of the best books about Apple Computer ever written".

In 2009, 25 years after The Little Kingdom, Moritz published a revised and expanded follow-up: Return to the Little Kingdom: How Apple and Steve Jobs Changed the World. In the prologue to Return to the Little Kingdom, Moritz states that he was as incensed as Jobs was about the Time Magazine special issue:

Steve rightly took umbrage over his portrayal and what he saw as a grotesque betrayal of confidences, while I was equally distraught by the way in which material I had arduously gathered for a book about Apple was siphoned, filtered, and poisoned with a gossipy benzene by an editor in New York whose regular task was to chronicle the wayward world of rock-and-roll music. Steve made no secret of his anger and left a torrent of messages on the answering machine I kept in my converted earthquake cottage at the foot of San Francisco's Potrero Hill. He, understandably, banished me from Apple and forbade anyone in his orbit to talk to me. The experience made me decide that I would never again work anywhere I could not exert a large amount of control over my own destiny or where I would be paid by the word. I finished my leave [and] published my book, The Little Kingdom: The Private Story of Apple Computer, which I felt, unlike the unfortunate magazine article, presented a balanced portrait of the young Steve Jobs.

=== Venture capitalist ===
In 1986, Moritz joined Sequoia Capital after co-authoring Going for Broke: The Chrysler Story with Barrett Seaman, Time's Detroit bureau chief. After leaving Time, Moritz co-founded Technologic Partners, a technology newsletter and conference company.

His internet company investments include Google, Yahoo!, Skyscanner, PayPal, Webvan, YouTube, eToys, and Zappos. He currently sits on the boards of 24/7 Customer, Earth Networks, Gamefly, HealthCentral, Green Dot Corporation, Klarna, Kayak.com, LinkedIn, Stripe and PopSugar. Moritz previously served on the boards of A123 Systems, Aricent Group, Atom Entertainment, CenterRun, eGroups, Flextronics, Google, ITA Software, Luxim, PayPal, Plaxo, Pure Digital, Saba Software, Yahoo!, and Zappos. Google was one of several co-investments with John Doerr of rival venture capital firm Kleiner Perkins Caufield & Byers, and the initial public offering of the company in 2004 made Moritz one of Wales' richest men. His investment in Google helped him achieve the number-one listing in Forbes' "Midas List" of the top dealmakers in the technology industry in 2006 and 2007, and a place on the 2007 "TIME 100". He ranked number two on the Midas List for 2008 and 2009.

In May 2012, he announced he would step back from his day-to-day responsibilities at Sequoia Capital while also being elevated to the position of chairman.

In July 2023, Moritz stepped down from Sequoia after nearly four decades. He remains on the boards of Stripe, Klarna and Instacart, but Sequoia said that those seats would be replaced over time. Moritz announced that he would focus on Sequoia Heritage—a wealth-management fund that he helped launch, now independent of Sequoia Capital.

=== The San Francisco Standard ===
The San Francisco Standard is a for-profit San Francisco-centric news web site, funded by Michael Moritz, with offices in the Mission District, using Instagram, Twitter, and YouTube. Griffin Gaffney is the CEO of the SF Standard as well as co-founder of Here/Say Media and TogetherSF, Moritz-funded 501(c)4 organizations. Griffin Gaffney is also a co-founder of PossibleSF.

== Recognition ==
In July 2010, Moritz was awarded an honorary fellowship from Cardiff University, where his father Alfred had previously been Vice-Principal and Professor of Classics.

In July 2014, he was recognized as a fellow of Aberystwyth University.

In November 2014, Moritz was awarded an honorary doctorate from the Hong Kong University of Science and Technology.

Moritz was appointed Knight Commander of the Order of the British Empire (KBE) in the 2013 Birthday Honours for services to promoting British economic interests and philanthropic work.

In 2026, he was awarded the Prize for Understanding and Tolerance.

== Personal life ==
Moritz lives in San Francisco with his wife, American novelist and sculptor Harriet Heyman, and their two sons.

In 2006, Moritz discovered he had a genetic abnormality that causes a rare, incurable form of blood cancer.

In March 2026 Moritz told the BBC that "Britain is an uncomfortable place for Jews today" and that he wanted German citizenship and was applying for a German passport. In August 2026 he told the Der Spiegel that he has finally received the German citizenship.

== Philanthropy and political involvement ==
Moritz is a signatory of The Giving Pledge, committing himself to give away at least 50% of his wealth to charitable causes.

In June 2008, Moritz and his wife announced a donation of US$50 million to Christ Church, his Oxford college, the largest single donation in the college's history.

In July 2012, it was announced that Moritz had donated £75m to Oxford University to provide £11,000 scholarships to students from families with an annual income below £16,000. The donation is the largest financial donation to an undergraduate university in European history.

In February 2013, he gave $5 million for Juilliard School's Music Advancement Program.

In September 2013, he and his wife gave $30 million to the University of California, San Francisco (UCSF) to create the UCSF Discovery Fellows Program, the largest endowed programme for PhD students in the history of the University of California; UCSF will raise $30 million in matching funds.

In February 2016, he and his wife gave $50 million to the University of Chicago (UC), benefiting the Odyssey programme, which supports lower-income students with outstanding potential; UC will raise $50 million in matching funds.

In October 2016, The Guardian reported that Michael Moritz "donated $49,999 to a divisive ballot measure intended to clear San Francisco's streets of homeless encampments, according to campaign filings". Moritz later wrote an op-ed for the Wall Street Journal opposing a homelessness funding measure.

In May 2018, Moritz donated $20 million to the American Civil Liberties Union (ACLU), the largest donation the organization has received.

He donated to the Lincoln Project, a Republican-led super PAC opposing the re-election of Donald Trump and Republican Senators who supported him. SFGate notes that he also donated $336 million into various political and social causes in San Francisco over three years. These causes include organizations such as SF Parent Action, which, in 2022, advocated for a recall of members of the city's school board, and also TogetherSF Action, which is known for ads critical of San Francisco's drug policies that appeared all over the city in May 2023.

In 2024, Moritz and TogetherSF backed the mayoral campaign of Mark Farrell.

In 2026, Mortitz donated $2 million to Building a Better California to fight a 5% tax on billionaires in California.

=== Crankstart ===
In 2019, it was announced that his and his wife's charity Crankstart would be sponsoring the Booker Prize for novelists for the next five years. The couple did not want the name of their charity to be attached to the prize, which subsequently reverted to its old name of the Booker Prize.

In September 2025, it was announced that Crankstart would give £150 million to the National Gallery London for a new extension, with a further £150 million coming from the Julia Rausing Trust.

== Books ==
In 2015, Moritz collaborated with Alex Ferguson on his book, Leading: Learning from Life and My Years at Manchester United, which draws on Ferguson's experience as a football manager, and provides lessons on achieving business and life success. In 2026, Moritz published Ausländer: One Family's Story of Escape and Exile, a memoir detailing his Jewish family's Holocaust tragedies through his late mother's documents.
