= Triumph of the Nerds =

1996 British/American television documentary

- Genre: Documentary
- Based on: Accidental Empires by Robert X. Cringely
- Written by: Robert X. Cringely
- Screenplay by: Robert X. Cringely
- Directed by: Paul Sen
- Narrated by: Robert X. Cringely
- Theme music composer: Nitin Sawhney
- Countries of origin: United Kingdom; United States
- Original language: English

Production
- Producer: John Gau
- Cinematography: John Booth
- Editor: Michael Duxbury
- Running time: 180 minutes (PBS); 150 minutes (Channel 4 and home video releases)
- Production companies: John Gau Productions for Channel 4 and Oregon Public Broadcasting

Original release
- Network: Channel 4; PBS
- Release: 14 April 1996

Related
- Nerds 2.0.1

Triumph of the Nerds is a 1996 British/American television documentary, produced by John Gau Productions and Oregon Public Broadcasting for Channel 4 and PBS. It explores the development of the personal computer in the United States from World War II to 1995. It was first screened as three episodes between 14 and 28 April 1996 on Channel 4, and as a single programme on 12 June 1996 on PBS.

Triumph of the Nerds was written and hosted by Robert X. Cringely (Mark Stephens) and based on his 1992 book Accidental Empires. The documentary comprises interviews with important figures connected with the personal computer, including Steve Jobs, Steve Wozniak, Bill Gates, Steve Ballmer, Paul Allen, Bill Atkinson, Andy Hertzfeld, Ed Roberts, and Larry Ellison. It also includes archival footage of Gary Kildall and commentary from Douglas Adams, the author of the science fiction series The Hitchhiker's Guide to the Galaxy. The title Triumph of the Nerds is a play on the title of the 1984 comedy Revenge of the Nerds.

Cringely followed the series with Nerds 2.0.1 (titled Glory of the Geeks in the UK), a history of the Internet to 1998. In 2012, Cringely released the full interview that Steve Jobs gave in 1995 for Triumph of the Nerds as Steve Jobs: The Lost Interview.

== Episodes ==
As broadcast by Channel 4:

- Impressing Their Friends (14 April 1996)
- Riding the Bear (21 April 1996)
- Great Artists Steal (28 April 1996)

== Interviewees ==
- Douglas Adams
- Paul Allen
- Bill Atkinson
- Steve Ballmer
- Dan Bricklin
- David Bunnell
- Rod Canion
- Esther Dyson
- Larry Ellison
- Chris Espinosa
- Gordon Eubanks
- Lee Felsenstein
- Bob Frankston
- Harry Garland
- Bill Gates
- Adele Goldberg
- Andy Hertzfeld
- Steve Jobs
- Gary Kildall
- Bill Lowe
- Roger Melen
- Bob Metcalfe
- Gordon Moore
- Tim Paterson
- Jeff Raikes
- Ed Roberts
- Arthur Rock
- John Sculley
- Charles Simonyi
- Bob Taylor
- Larry Tesler
- John Warnock
- Jim Warren
- Steve Wozniak

== Reception and influence ==
Triumph of the Nerds was a successful series and Cringely noted in a 1998 interview that it was "a stalwart of [PBS] pledge drives all across America."

Steve Wozniak discussed the film on the letters portion of his official website stating: "I liked Triumph of the Nerds. It was one of the best shows ever created of that kind. Everyone has the same opinion, so why ask me? I'm not a history expert and couldn't tell you what it missed or got wrong, but it seemed extremely thorough and insightful."

Actor Noah Wyle has also stated that after initially resisting the role, he finally agreed to portray Steve Jobs in the 1999 film Pirates of Silicon Valley after viewing Triumph of the Nerds.
