= The Code (2001 film) =

2001 film

- Directed by: Hannu Puttonen
- Written by: Hannu Puttonen
- Produced by: Jacques Debs; Delphine Morel
- Starring: Eric Allman; Alan Cox; Miguel de Icaza; Jon "maddog" Hall; Ari Lemmke; David S. Miller; Eric Raymond; Richard M. Stallman; Linus Torvalds; Theodore Ts'o; Bob Young
- Edited by: Kimmo Kohtamäki
- Music by: Pertti Grönholm
- Release date: 2001
- Running time: 58 minutes
- Country: Finland
- Languages: English, Finnish

The Code is a documentary in the English and Finnish languages about Linux from 2001.

== Featured in the film ==
- Linus Torvalds
- Richard Stallman
- Alan Cox
- Eric S. Raymond
- Robert "Bob" Young
- Jon "maddog" Hall
- Theodore Y. "Ted" Ts'o
- David S. Miller
- Miguel de Icaza
- Ari Lemmke
- Eric Allman
- Andrew Leonard
- Larry Augustin
