= Pirates of Silicon Valley =

1999 American biographical television film

- Promotional poster
- Genre: Biographical drama
- Based on: Fire in the Valley: The Making of The Personal Computer by Paul Freiberger and Michael Swaine
- Written by: Martyn Burke
- Directed by: Martyn Burke
- Starring: Noah Wyle; Anthony Michael Hall; Joey Slotnick; John DiMaggio; Josh Hopkins
- Music by: Frank Fitzpatrick
- Country of origin: United States
- Original language: English

Production
- Executive producers: Steven Haft; Nick Lombardo
- Producer: Leanne Moore
- Cinematography: Ousama Rawi
- Editor: Richard Halsey
- Running time: 95 minutes
- Production companies: Haft Entertainment; St. Nick Productions

Original release
- Network: TNT
- Release: June 20, 1999

Pirates of Silicon Valley is a 1999 American biographical drama television film written and directed by Martyn Burke and starring Noah Wyle as Steve Jobs and Anthony Michael Hall as Bill Gates. Spanning the years 1971–1997 and based on Paul Freiberger and Michael Swaine's 1984 book Fire in the Valley: The Making of the Personal Computer, it explores the impact that the rivalry between Jobs (Apple Computer) and Gates (Microsoft) had on the development of the personal computer. The film premiered on TNT on June 20, 1999.

== Plot ==
Steve Jobs is speaking with director Ridley Scott about the creation of the 1984 advertisement for Apple Computer, which introduced the first Macintosh. Jobs is trying to convey his idea that "We're creating a completely new consciousness." Scott is more concerned with the technical aspects of the advertisement.

Next in 1997 with Jobs, returning to Apple, and announcing a new deal with Microsoft at the 1997 Macworld Expo. His partner, Steve "Woz" Wozniak, is introduced as one of the two central narrators of the story. Wozniak notes to the audience the resemblance between Big Brother and the image of Bill Gates on the screen behind Jobs during this announcement. Asking how they "got from there to here", the film turns to flashbacks of his youth with Jobs, prior to the forming of Apple.

The earliest flashback is in 1971 and takes place on the U.C. Berkeley campus during the period of the student anti-war movements. Teenagers Steve Jobs and Steve Wozniak are shown caught on the campus during a riot between students and police. They flee and after finding safety, Jobs states to Wozniak, "Those guys think they're revolutionaries. They're not revolutionaries, we are." Wozniak then comments that "Steve was never like you or me. He always saw things differently. Even when I was in Berkeley, I would see something and just see kilobytes or circuit boards while he'd see karma or the meaning of the universe."

Using a similar structure, the film next turns to a young Bill Gates at Harvard University, in the early 1970s, with classmate Steve Ballmer, and Gates's high school friend Paul Allen. As with Wozniak in the earlier segment, Ballmer narrates Gates's story, particularly the moment when Gates discovers the existence of Ed Roberts's MITS Altair causing him to drop out of Harvard. Gates's and Allen's early work with MITS is juxtaposed against the involvement of Jobs and Wozniak with the "Homebrew Computer Club". Jobs and Woz develop Apple Computer in the garage of Jobs's family home, with the help of Daniel and Elizabeth. Eventually, Mike Markkula invests in the company which allows it to expand and move forward. In 1977, Jobs, Woz, and Markkula demo the Apple II at the West Coast Computer Faire. This event is followed by the development of the IBM PC with the help of Gates and Microsoft in 1981.

The film follows Jobs's relationship with his high school girlfriend and early Apple employee, Arlene (a pseudonym for Chrisann Brennan), and the difficulties he had with acknowledging his parental legitimacy of their daughter, Lisa. Around the time she was born, Jobs unveiled his next computer, which he named Lisa. The Lisa was followed in 1984 by the Macintosh, both having been inspired by the Xerox Alto.

During the October 1983 Apple keynote address, Jobs shows a preview of the 1984 Macintosh commercial. During which he also finds out that Microsoft secured a licensing deal in Japan to deploy PCs with Microsoft apps, including the upcoming Windows 1.0. Jobs and Gates then have a bitter falling out. Jobs claimed that Gates completely ripped off of Apple's design and went behind their backs to secure a deal against their partnership. Gates responds by saying that they were within their contractual rights to do so, that Apple had done the same thing to Xerox, and rather that it was analogous to both of them stealing from a rich neighbor who left their door unlocked. The main body of the film finally concludes with a 30th birthday toast in 1985 to Steve Jobs shortly before he was forced out of Apple by CEO John Sculley.

The film ends in 1997, with the return of 42-year-old Jobs to Apple (after its acquisition of NeXT Computer) and with his announcement at the MacWorld Expo of an alliance between Apple and Microsoft. It also indicates that Jobs is now married, has children, and has reconciled with Lisa.

== Cast ==
- Noah Wyle as Steve Jobs
- Anthony Michael Hall as Bill Gates
- Joey Slotnick as Steve Wozniak
- John DiMaggio as Steve Ballmer
- Josh Hopkins as Paul Allen
- Gailard Sartain as Ed Roberts
- Jeffrey Nordling as Mike Markkula
- Allan Royal as John Sculley
- J. G. Hertzler as Ridley Scott
- Gema Zamprogna as "Arlene" (a pseudonym for Chrisann Brennan)
- Brooke Radding as Lisa Brennan-Jobs
- Wayne Pere as Captain Crunch
- Brian Lester as Charles Simonyi
- Gerald McCullouch as Rod Brock
- Marcus Giamatti as Daniel Kottke
- Melissa McBride as Elizabeth Holmes

== Production ==
=== Development ===
Burke notes that when he was shown the first draft of the screenplay, which is based upon Freiberger and Swaine's Fire in the Valley, "It was all about how the '286 computer' became the '386' and so on ... I was bored by it." After the studio asked him for suggestions Burke states that "I'm a great believer in Shakespeare, and what we had was a modern equivalent of Hamlet, featuring two young princes, Bill Gates and Steve Jobs ... the more I read about Steve in particular, the more I saw him in those Shakespearean terms. He was brilliant, volcanic, obsessive, suspicious, even vicious in a business sense. He was about conquest, always conquest. I said, 'That's the sort of movie I want to make.'" Burke was thus hired as director of the project and rewrote the screenplay. In developing the characters themselves, Burke also stated that he chose not to speak with any of the central figures portrayed in the film:

I did not want to do an "authorized biography" on either Microsoft or Apple, so we made the decision going in that we would not talk or meet with them. With a team of Harvard researchers, I embarked on a seven-month research project that encompassed virtually everything we could find on the history of both companies, including old technical magazines from the '70s. I intended every scene to be based on actual events, including such seemingly fantastic moments as Bill Gates's bulldozer races in the middle of the night and Steve Jobs's bare feet going up on the board room table during an applicant's job interview. I have two or more sources that verify each scene.

=== Casting ===
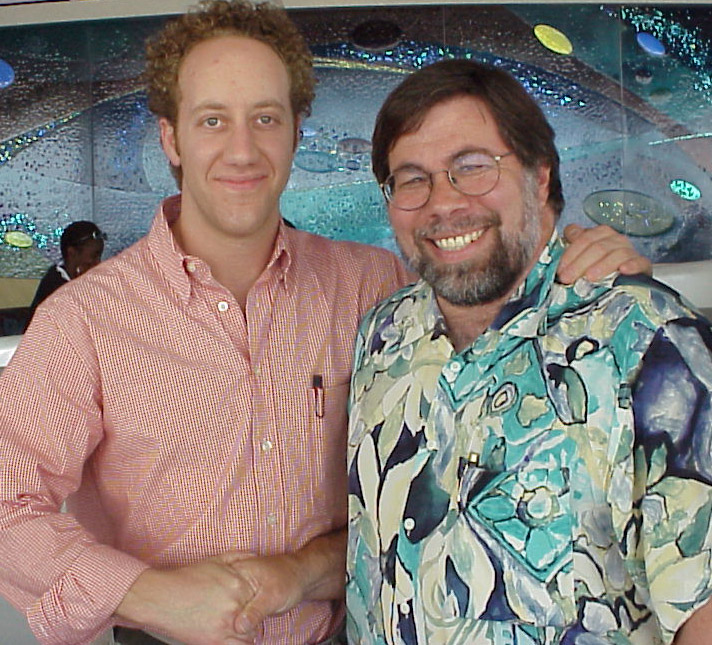
Joey Slotnick (left) played Steve Wozniak (right) in the film.

Burke sought Noah Wyle for the part of Jobs. Wyle originally turned down the role, but changed his mind after Burke had him watch the 1996 documentary, Triumph of the Nerds. Wyle states that he watched the documentary "for ten seconds and knew I'd kick myself for the rest of my life if I didn't play this part." He also noted that Triumph of the Nerds led him to be "taken by [Jobs's] presence, his confidence, smugness, smartness, ego, and his story's trajectory. He seemed to be the most Shakespearean figure in American culture in the last 50 years I could think of – the rise of, the fall of, and the return of. The truest definition of a tragic hero—but you get the 'bonus round' that F. Scott Fitzgerald said didn't exist. Jobs has had one hell of a second act." Burke later credited Wyle for the success of the film stating that, "whatever was in the air, [Wyle] just absorbed it ... he became Jobs. It was a remarkable transformation. We had a photo of Steve Jobs at about 28 years old, from the cover of Fortune magazine. We did a mockup with Noah and it was almost impossible to tell them apart." Burke also credits Joey Slotnick's interpretation of Steve Wozniak with Wozniak's enthusiasm for the film; Wozniak was so impressed that he flew to Los Angeles to have lunch with Slotnick. Burke notes that, "Steve Wozniak made several speeches in which he said that the film accurately portrays how things actually happened ... To me that was better than any awards or nominations the film could get."

Anthony Michael Hall, who was cast as Bill Gates, commented on his interest in the role, stating that he, "really fought for this part because I knew it would be the role of a lifetime ... it was a thrill and a daunting challenge to play someone of his stature and brilliance."

=== Filming ===
Pirates of Silicon Valley was originally scheduled to be shot in Toronto, with more than $1 million in sets. However, when Wyle was unable to receive a long enough release from ER to shoot in Canada, the film temporarily shut down. Filming began again later in Los Angeles. During the filming, the cast broke down into PC and Mac factions, arguing over the merits of each platform. Burke states that he began the film as a PC user and ended a Mac user.

== Themes ==
Young Steve Jobs participated in aspects of the 1960s counterculture. Actor Noah Wyle, who portrays Jobs, stated in an interview with CNN, "These kids grew up 30 miles south of the [University of California] Berkeley campus, which was ripe with revolution ... and they couldn't have cared less about the politics going on. They were in the garage tinkering with their electronics and starting a revolution that was a thousand times greater than anything that was going on the college campuses, politically." Director Martyn Burke also noted in an interview that, "Steve Jobs and Bill Gates are the true revolutionaries of our time. Not the students who occupied the dean's office in the late '60s. Not the anti-war marchers who were determined to overthrow the establishment. Jobs and Gates are the ones who changed the way the world thinks, acts and communicates."

== Music ==
The soundtrack consists of classic rock, disco, and new wave from the 1960s, 1970s, and early-mid 1980s.

In the DVD edition, the piano song that is playing in the scene when Steve Jobs accuses Bill Gates of stealing Apple's ideas is not on the soundtrack. That omission sparked a search that lasted a few years until it was eventually found to be "Soliloquy" by English composer Tony Hymas. The song was originally published in the 1980 collection "The Piano Album", correctly fitting the movie events timeline. The original TV aired and VHS had music that differed from the DVD.

No.	Title	Artist	Length
1.	"Question (1970)"	Moody Blues	4:54
2.	"Isn't Life Strange (1972)"	Moody Blues	6:10
3.	"I Put a Spell on You (1968)"	Creedence Clearwater Revival	2:25
4.	"No Time (1970)"	The Guess Who	3:29
5.	"In-A-Gadda-Da-Vida (1968)"	Iron Butterfly	2:52
6.	"Get Down Tonight (1975)"	KC and the Sunshine Band	3:12
7.	"Synchronicity I (1983)"	The Police	3:23
8.	"Collage (1969)"	The James Gang	3:32
9.	"Gemini Dream (1981)"	Moody Blues	3:47
10.	"Burning Down the House (1983)"	Talking Heads	4:00
11.	"Everybody Wants to Rule the World (1985)"	Tears for Fears	4:13

== Reception ==
=== Critical response ===
The personalities were very accurately portrayed ... Incidents [in the film] are accurate in the sense that they all occurred but they are often with the wrong parties (Bill Fernandez, Apple employee #4, was with me and the computer that burned up in 1970) and at the wrong dates (when John Sculley joined, he had to redirect attention from the Apple III, not the Mac, to the Apple II) and places (Homebrew Computer Club was at Stanford Linear Accelerator Center) ... The personal drives portrayed in the movie were amazingly accurate. So were the key personalities, but not some others ... Mike was portrayed in the movie in a very inaccurate and unfair way, making it look like he was financially shrewd. Actually, he was intellectually open and contributing and, more than anyone else, he ran and structured the company in the early days, while Steve floated around getting his feet wet at running a company and learning to be a top executive.

— Steve Wozniak

On the review aggregator website Rotten Tomatoes, 89% of 9 critics' reviews are positive. The website's consensus reads: "The accomplishments of visionaries Steve Jobs (Noah Wyle) and Bill Gates (Anthony Michael Hall) revolutionize the 20th century." Ray Richmond of Variety states that it is "a brilliant piece of filmmaking" and "a wildly entertaining geek tragedy with the stylistic feel of true art." John Leonard of New York Magazine, refers to it as "a hoot". Rob Owen of the Pittsburgh Post-Gazette argues that the film is "a fascinating drama filled with Shakespearean twists and betrayals as viewers come to know the geniuses who transformed not only the way we communicate, but the way we live." Brian J. Dillard of AllMovie argues that "thanks to inspired casting and strong writing, this well-oiled TV biopic managed to transform the unglamorous genesis of the personal-computer industry into solid entertainment precisely at the moment when dot-com mania was sweeping the nation." Mike Lipton of People, found the film to be "engagingly irreverent" and "a real-life Revenge of the Nerds [that] stands cheekily on its own."

=== Historical accuracy ===
[The day before the 1999 Macworld, Steve Jobs went shopping and] bought me a matching pair of blue jeans and a black turtleneck sweater and matching round eyeglasses. He'd written a sketch for us to perform the next day at Macworld. I'd put my hands together in a kind of Jobs-like silent-prayer pose and then launch into his keynote. And then a few minutes into the address he'd come storming onto the stage and say, 'Wyle, you don't have me at all! What the hell are you doing? First I pick up my slide-clicker and then I put my hands together.' He'd say, 'Ladies and gentlemen, Noah Wyle!; And then he'd kick me off the stage and take over, introducing the latest piece of Apple technology. And that's exactly how we did it. The first few rows, I think, could obviously tell it wasn't him, but most others didn't know at all. And there was this growing ripple of laughter throughout the auditorium when people got what was happening. I honestly had had no idea what to expect: I thought the whole thing might be an ambush—that he'd get me to his event and that what he said we were going to do in fact wasn't what we were going to do, and I would somehow be humiliated. But he stayed on script and was very kind to me.

— Noah Wyle

Steve Jobs, Bill Gates, and Steve Wozniak all responded to the film. Jobs told a journalist that the television movie was "brutal" and "mean-spirited": "But as an actor, Noah Wyle definitely had done his homework on me in terms of my mannerisms and my quirks. So I called him the next day, just to tell him I thought he did a nice job." After Pirates of Silicon Valley had aired, he phoned Wyle and told him that while he "hated" both the film and the screenplay, he liked Wyle's performance, noting "you do look like me." Jobs then invited Wyle to the 1999 Macworld convention to play a prank on the audience. Wyle agreed and initially appeared as Jobs, until Jobs walked onto the stage and let the audience in on the joke. Ken Segall recalled Jobs being "thrilled" when Wyle was first cast and he later wrote the on-stage dialogue for Wyle and Jobs. He recounted that Jobs denied ever asking a prospective employee about his virginity, as depicted in the film. In contrast, Jobs avoided meeting the director Martyn Burke, who later said that "Steve wanted nothing to do with me." In a 2013 Ask Me Anything session with Reddit, Gates responded to a question about his portrayal in the film by stating that it was "reasonably accurate".

Wozniak had a positive response to the film and discussed it in detail with fans on his official website. Wozniak said that many aspects of the film were accurate, stating that "when the movie opened with [a scene of] tear gas and riots ... I thought, 'My God! That's just how it was.'" He also responded to a fan email, that some of his portrayal was inaccurate: "I never quit Apple. That suggestion was based on an incorrect Wall Street Journal [article] that said I was leaving Apple because I didn't like things there. Actually, I had told the Wall Street Journal writer that I wasn't leaving Apple because of things that I didn't like and that I wasn't even leaving, keeping my small salary forever as a loyal employee. I just wanted a small startup experience and a chance to design a smaller product again, a universal remote control." In May 2015, Wozniak once again commented on the film, stating that Pirates of Silicon Valley is an example of a good Hollywood dramatization of himself, Steve Jobs, and the story of Apple Inc. He described Pirates of Silicon Valley as "intriguing, interesting. I loved watching it ... every one of those incidences occurred and it occurred with the meaning that was shown" in the film.

A college friend of Jobs and early Apple employee Daniel Kottke also liked the film. He noted in an interview that it was "a great movie. Noah Wyle was just uncannily close to Jobs. Just unbelievable. I found myself thinking it was actually Steve on the screen." He also states that in the film there were "all these scenes of the garage where it's like half a dozen people working, busily carrying things back and forth, and oscilloscopes" when he [Kottke] "was really the only person who worked in the garage. Woz would show up once a week with his latest to test it out, and Steve Jobs was on the phone a lot in the kitchen."

Two individuals have responded to the film's interpretation of the 1979 visit of Jobs and his team to the Xerox PARC research center, which influenced the development of both the Lisa and Macintosh computers. PARC's director, John Seely Brown stated in a 2006 interview that the scene in which Gates and Jobs argue about the role of Xerox is not entirely accurate. He said that Jobs was invited by PARC to view their technology in exchange for the ability to buy pre-IPO Apple stock. Wozniak said, "Apple worked with Xerox openly to bring their developments to a mass audience. That's what Steve portrayed Apple as being good at. Xerox got a lot of Apple stock for it too, it was an agreement. Microsoft just took it from Xerox or Apple or whomever. It took them a long time to get it halfway right."

== Home Media ==
Film was distributed by Turner Home Entertainment on August 30, 2005. On June 16, 2026, was re-released by Warner Bros. Home Entertainment.

=== Accolades ===
Award	Date of ceremony	Category	Recipient(s)	Result
American Cinema Editors Eddie Awards	2000	Best Two-Hour Motion Picture for Commercial TV	Richard Halsey	Won
Online Film & Television Association	1998-1999	Best Motion Picture Made for Television	Pirates of Silicon Valley	Won
Online Film & Television Association	1998-1999	Best Actor in a Motion Picture or Miniseries	Noah Wyle	Nominated
51st Primetime Emmy Awards	September 12, 1999	Outstanding Writing for a Miniseries or a Movie	Martyn Burke	Nominated
51st Primetime Emmy Awards	September 12, 1999	Outstanding Made for Television Movie	Nick Lombardo; Steven Haft; Leanne Moore	Nominated
51st Primetime Emmy Awards	September 12, 1999	Outstanding Casting for a Miniseries or a Made for Television Movie	Lisa Freiberger	Nominated
51st Primetime Emmy Awards	September 12, 1999	Outstanding Single Camera Picture Editing for a Miniseries or a Movie	Richard Halsey	Nominated
51st Primetime Emmy Awards	September 12, 1999	Outstanding Sound Mixing for a Miniseries or a Movie	Stephen Halbert; Phillip Seretti	Nominated
52nd Directors Guild of America Awards	March 11, 2000	Outstanding Directorial Achievement in Movies for Television	Martyn Burke	Nominated
Producers Guild of America Awards 1999	March 2, 2000	Outstanding Producer of Long-Form Television	Steven Haft; Nick Lombardo	Nominated
Casting Society of America	1999	Artios Awards: Movie of the Week Casting	Lisa Freiberger	Nominated

== See also ==
- List of depictions of Steve Jobs
