= The Second Coming of Steve Jobs =

2000 biography by Alan Deutschman

- Author: Alan Deutschman
- Subject: Biography
- Publisher: Random House, Inc.
- Publication date: 2000
- Pages: 352
- ISBN: 978-0-7679-0433-9

The Second Coming of Steve Jobs is an unauthorized biography of Steve Jobs, co-founder of Apple Inc., written by Vanity Fair magazine journalist Alan Deutschman. It covers Jobs' tenure at NeXT, his success at Pixar, and his return to Apple, cumulating in the introduction of the iMac.
