= Robert X. Cringely =

American technology journalist (1953–2026)

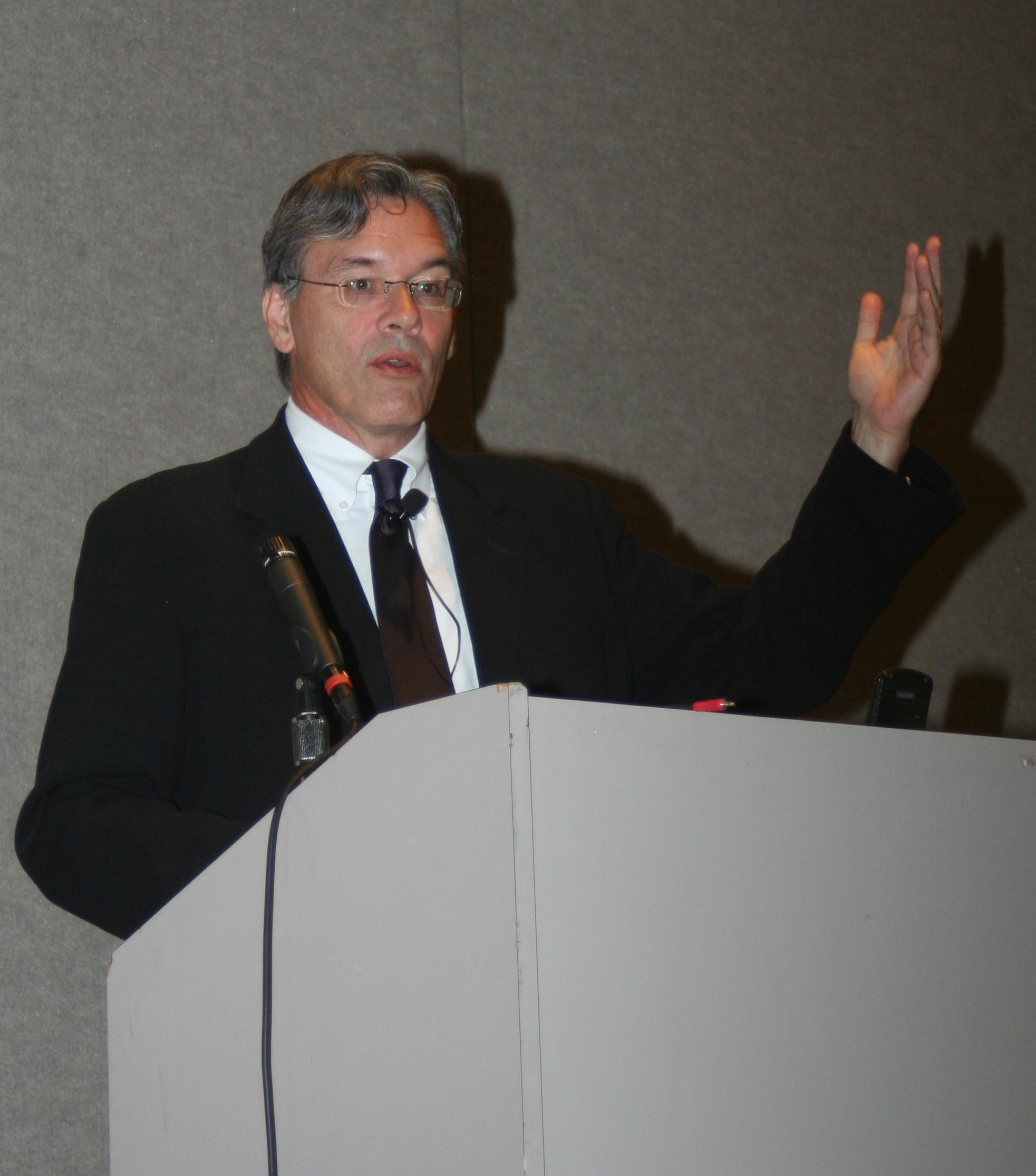
- Cringely in 2006
- Born: Mark Stephens; January 28, 1953; Apple Creek, Ohio, U.S.
- Died: October 3, 2026 (aged 73); Charlottesville, Virginia, U.S.
- Education: BA, College of Wooster, 1975; MA, Stanford University
- Occupations: Journalist, Technology writer
- Known for: InfoWorld column Accidental Empires: How the Boys of Silicon Valley Make Their Millions, Battle Foreign Competition and Still Can't Get a Date
- Spouse: Mary Alyce
- Children: 4
- Website: www.cringely.com

Mark Stephens (January 28, 1953 – October 3, 2026), known by the pen name Robert X. Cringely, was an American technology journalist. He wrote an influential and often republished column in InfoWorld, the one-time weekly computer trade newspaper published by IDG. Cringely also participated in various other work, including the documentaries Triumph of the Nerds: The Rise of Accidental Empires (1996) and Nerds 2.0.1: A Brief History of the Internet (1998). He later published independently on his own website, I, Cringely.

== Life and career ==
Mark Stephens was born in Apple Creek, Ohio on January 28, 1953. He earned a bachelor's degree from the College of Wooster in Ohio in 1975 and a Master's degree in Communication from Stanford University in 1979, where he also pursued work toward a doctorate. He served on the "Public's Right to Information Task Force" as part of the President's Commission on the Accident at Three Mile Island. He has claimed he was employee #12 at Apple, Inc., though Daniel Kottke also claims this number.

He contributed to the magazine InfoWorld under his pen name, Robert X. Cringely. Cringely's writing regularly appeared in publications such as Forbes, Newsweek, Success, The New York Times, Upside, and Worth. Stephens has also appeared as Cringely in two documentaries based on his writings: Triumph of the Nerds: The Rise of Accidental Empires (1996) and Nerds 2.0.1: A Brief History of the Internet (1998) and in a three-part documentary on PBS called Plane Crazy, in which he attempted to build an aircraft in 30 days and fly it when completed. The project quickly fell behind schedule and he became angry with the film crew. Eventually, Cringely admitted defeat and cut up the aircraft. In the final episode, he builds an existing kit designed and assisted by Fisher Aero.

After a financial disagreement in 1995, Stephens was dismissed from InfoWorld and was promptly sued by IDG to prevent him from continuing to use the Cringely trademark. A settlement was reached out of court that allowed him to use the name, so long as he did not contribute to competing technology magazines.

As Cringely, Stephens produced and hosted an Internet television show called NerdTV (2005–06) for PBS and, until late 2008, wrote an online column for the PBS website called I, Cringely: The Pulpit. On November 14, 2008, Stephens announced that he would stop contributing columns to PBS as of that December 15. He indicated that the move was his own decision "and not that of PBS, which has been nothing but good to me these many years". He also blogged for the Technology Evangelist site during 2007.

From 2009 through 2026, he posted articles on his own I, Cringely site.

Stephens died in Charlottesville, Virginia on October 3, 2026, at the age of 73. He and his wife, Mary Alyce, had four sons, two of whom preceded him in death.
