= John Gau (producer) =

British television (1940–2024)

John Gau CBE
- Born: John Glen Mackay Gau; 25 March 1940; London, England
- Died: 3 March 2024 (aged 83)
- Education: Trinity Hall, Cambridge; University of Wisconsin
- Occupation: Television producer
- Spouse: Susan Tebbs (m. 1966)
- Children: 2
- Parent(s): Nan Munro; Cullis William "Bill" Gau
- Relatives: Rayne Kruger (stepfather)

John Glen Mackay Gau (25 March 1940 – 3 March 2024) was a British television producer.

John Glen Mackay Gau was born in London to South African parents, Nan Munro, an actress, and her husband, Cullis William "Bill" Gau, a civil engineer.

Bill Gau was killed in action during the Second World War, and Nan married the author Rayne Kruger, who eventually left her for the cookery writer Prue Leith.

He was educated at Haileybury, followed by classics and modern languages at Trinity Hall, Cambridge, then the University of Wisconsin, where he became involved in campus television.

In 1963, he joined the BBC as an assistant film editor in 1963 and within two years became a producer.

In 1966, he married the actress Susan Tebbs, and together they started John Gau Productions.

Gau was appointed a CBE in 1989, he chaired the Independent Programme Producers Association from 1983 to 1986, and the Royal Television Society from 1987 to 1991 and was a director of Channel 4 from 1984 to 1988. On 3 March 2024, Gau died aged 83.
