= WOZ =

WOZ, WoZ or Woz may refer to:

- Woz, a nickname of Steve Wozniak (born 1950), an American–Serbian electrical engineer who co-founded Apple, Inc.
  - Wheels of Zeus (WoZ), a company founded by Steve Wozniak
  - .woz file, a software preservation format for the Apple II, named after Steve Wozniak
  - Woz Cup, the Segway Polo world championship named after Wozniak
  - Woz U, a tech education platform launched by Wozniak

== Characters ==
- Woz, a character in the Japanese television series Kamen Rider Zi-O
- Woz, a character in the anime and manga series Eureka Seven
- Betty Woz, from the song Betty Woz Gone by English girl group Stooshe

== Television ==
- "Woz", an episode of the science fiction television series Lexx
- "The Woz", the first episode of the American animated television show Code Monkeys
- Scott the Woz, a program broadcast by the U.S. cable TV channel G4

== Other uses ==
- La Woz, a cultural society of the Antillean country of Saint Lucia
- WOZ Die Wochenzeitung, a Swiss newspaper
- "Woz Not Woz", a 2004 song by Swedish DJs Eric Prydz and Steve Angello
