= UEI =

UEI may refer to:

== Organizations ==
- Unidad Especial de Intervención ("Special Intervention Unit"), the emergency response unit of the Spanish Guardia Civil
- UEI College, a career education school in California, US
- Universal Electronics Inc, an American manufacture of electronic remote control and sensing products

== Other uses ==
- Unique Entity Identifier, a unique identifier for companies in the US
- Unified Emulator Interface, a component of the software Eclipse
