= Ray Super Remote =

The Ray Super Remote is a touchscreen universal remote control that recommends what to watch and controls your home. The product consists of a touchscreen remote and a charging stand. The remote can control TV's, cable boxes, receivers, Blu-ray players, game consoles and certain smart lights and thermostats.

The Ray Super Remote was created by Ray Enterprises in New York City and launched in October 2015. In February 2017, Ray Enterprises laid all employees off and closed its business.
