= Candice Clark =

American former slalom canoeist

Medal record

Women's canoe slalom

Representing United States

World Championships
Gold medal – first place	1973 Muotathal	K-1 team

Candice Clark is an American former slalom canoeist who competed in the 1970s. She was once married to Apple co-founder Steve Wozniak. Clark is the daughter of Louise Clark, owner of the Lafayette hillside memorial. She graduated from UC Berkeley in 1979 with a degree in business administration. She is now married to Ronald Kauffman.

== Olympics ==
Candice Clark was a member of the 1976 US Olympic Team; Canoeing in Montreal.

== World Championships ==
Clark won a gold medal in the K-1 Slalom team event at the 1973 ICF Canoe Slalom World Championships in Muotathal and a silver medal in the Wildwater team event in the ICF Canoe World Championships. She was a member of the 1974 US Flatwater Kayak World Championship Team in Mexico City. She was a member of the 1975 US Whitewater Kayak World Championship Team in Spital, Austria. Clark was a member of the 1977 US Whitewater Kayak World Championship Team in Skopja, Yugoslavia.

== National Championships ==
Clark won gold in the 1974 US Slalom Kayak National Championships in Buena Vista, Colorado. She was silver medalist in the 1974 Kayak Wildwater National Championships. She won the 1974 K2 Flatwater Kayak National Championships. She won the 1974 Flatwater North American Championships in Toronto, Canada. She won the 1974 Spital, Austria K-1 Slalom Regional Championships. She was the only person to win both the slalom and flatwater Kayak National Championships in the same year.

== Relationship with Steve Wozniak ==
Clark married Wozniak in June 1981. In 1987 Wozniak filed for divorce. They have three children. Their daughter, Sara Clark, is a lawyer for the US Olympic Committee in Colorado Springs, Colorado.
