= Gina Smith =

American technology/science journalist

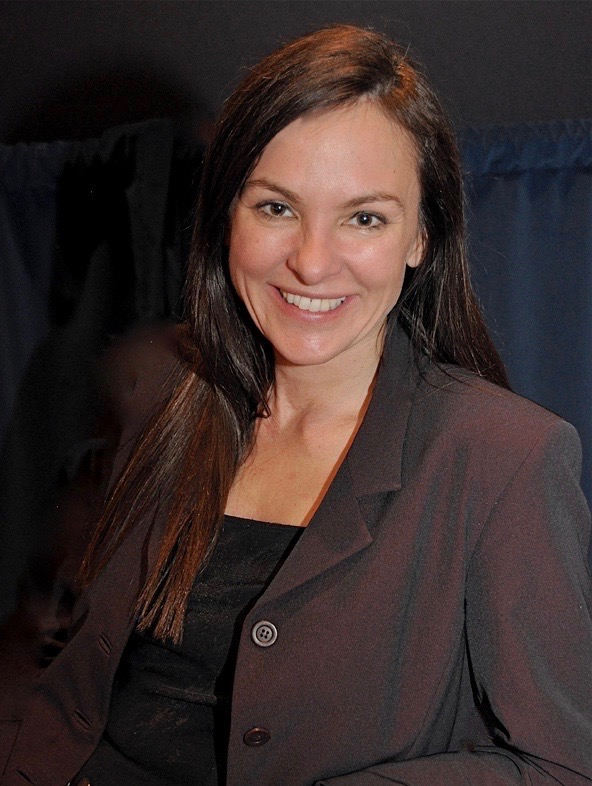
- Smith in March 2000
- Born: Regina Patricia Smith; Daytona Beach, Florida, U.S.
- Education: Florida State University
- Occupations: Author; journalist; entrepreneur
- Known for: Journalism
- Relatives: Svetomir Đukić (maternal grandfather)
- Website: ginasmith.com

Gina Smith is an American entrepreneur, author, and journalist who co-wrote Steve Wozniak's 2006 autobiography iWoz. In 2001, Smith was named one of the 100 most influential people in technology by Upside magazine.

== Technology journalism ==
From 1990 to 2000, Smith wrote the "Inside Silicon Valley" technology column in the San Francisco Sunday Chronicle. During that time, she was a investigative news reporter for PC Week, senior editor at PC/Computing magazine, and later, as of 1994, she was the editor-in-chief of IDG's Electronic Entertainment magazine. From 1993 to 1997, she hosted the radio show On Computers with Gina Smith and Leo Laporte and from 1997 to 2000 she hosted ABC Radio's Connected with Gina Smith, a radio call-in show that ran in syndication.

In 1995, she co-hosted, with John Levine, an educational PBS special, The Internet Show: Drivers' Education for the Internet Superhighway.

Also in 1995 ABC News hired Smith as a technology correspondent, where she covered technology news for ABC News' Nightline with Ted Koppel, ABC World News Tonight with Peter Jennings, and Good Morning America.

Smith hosted the ESPN weekly series Nothing But Net with Pat O'Brien in 1995 and 1996. She also hosted a daily tech news show on the Discovery Channel in 1996 and 1997 called Cyberlife. Cyberlife was nominated for a CableACE Award in the Business/Consumer Programming Special or Series category in 1997.

In 1999 Smith joined CNET as anchor of the News.Com daily news show on CNBC.

In 2010, Smith returned to journalism as editor-in-chief of the online relaunch of Byte magazine as Byte.com.

Since 2011, she has been CEO of aNewDomain Media, which runs several news websites.

== Business ventures ==
In 2000, Smith was named CEO of the New Internet Computer Company, which she co-founded with Larry Ellison. The firm closed in 2003.

In 2004, David Warthen appointed Smith president of Eye Games, a San Francisco-based video game technology company.

== Bibliography ==
- —; Von Stiegel, Herta (2011). The Mountain Within: Leadership Lessons For Your Climb To The Top. McGraw Hill. ISBN 978-0-07-177325-6.
- Wozniak, Steve; — (2006). iWoz: From Computer Geek to Cult Icon: How I Invented the Personal Computer, Co-Founded Apple, and Had Fun Doing It. W. W. Norton. ISBN 0-393-06143-4.
- — (2005). The Genomics Age: How DNA Technology is Transforming the Way We Live and who We are. AMACOM--American Management Association. ISBN 978-0-8144-0843-8.
- — (2004). "Sladjana". In Perin, Margo (ed.). How I Learned to Cook: And Other Writings on Complex Mother-Daughter Relationships (anthology). Jeremy P. Tarcher/Penguin. pp. 195–209. ISBN 978-1585422913.
- —; Laporte, Leo (1 March 1995). 101 Computer Answers You Need To Know. Ziff-Davis Press. ISBN 978-1562763398. LCCN 95159818. OCLC 32516630. OL 873902M – via Internet Archive.
- —; Palatto, John (1991). Building Applications with Toolbook. Brady. ISBN 0-13-092420-2.
