= IWoz =

2006 autobiography by Steve Wozniak

iWoz: From Computer Geek to Cult Icon: How I Invented the Personal Computer, Co-Founded Apple, and Had Fun Doing It
- Author: Steve Wozniak with Gina Smith
- Language: English
- Genre: Autobiography
- Publisher: W. W. Norton
- Publication date: 2006
- Publication place: United States
- Media type: Print (hardback)
- Pages: 288 p.
- ISBN: 0-393-06143-4
- OCLC: 972704219

iWoz: From Computer Geek to Cult Icon: How I Invented the Personal Computer, Co-Founded Apple, and Had Fun Doing It is a 2006 New York Times bestselling autobiography by computer engineer and programmer Steve Wozniak. It was co-authored by writer Gina Smith and published by W. W. Norton & Company.

In iWoz, Wozniak gives a short history of his life, the founding of Apple Computer and some of his other ventures. Near the end of the book, Wozniak explains that he wrote the book in order to dispel some misconceptions that have been spread about him, his relationship with Steve Jobs and his relationship with and feelings towards Apple. Wozniak presents his story in short vignettes, never longer than a few pages, and most no longer than just a few paragraphs.

The photo plates of the book use several images from Wikimedia Commons.

== Synopsis ==
Wozniak starts his autobiography with a description of his parents, some of their history, and describes how his father had a top secret job involving electronics. He goes on to describe how his father took the time to describe to him, in detail, how electronic components work. He cites this as a major reason for his later success.

Wozniak discusses how he decided to enroll at the University of Colorado, Boulder. Because of the high tuition, and an inadvertent expense he had incurred for the university's computer department, he was unable to attend for a second year and instead enrolled in the local junior college, De Anza College.

Wozniak describes his encounter with the first successful video arcade game, Pong, at a bowling alley with Alice (then his fiancée). He describes just staring at it, amazed that computers could be used in such a way. He went home and recreated the game on his own, using a standard television for the display (which in itself, took some doing). He even added some features not found on the commercial game, such as displaying the score onscreen and displaying four-letter exclamations when missing a ball. Once while visiting Jobs, he showed it to one of the top executives of Atari, Inc., Al Alcorn (who was also the designer of the original game), who was so impressed that he offered Wozniak a job right on the spot. Wozniak declined, however, explaining that he could never leave Hewlett-Packard (HP) where he was currently employed.

While still with HP, Wozniak describes his moonlighting development, with Jobs, of the prototype of the arcade game Breakout for Atari, Inc. in only four days. He also describes, without bitterness, how Jobs shortchanged him on the job. Jobs, who worked for Atari Inc., said he would give Wozniak half of "whatever they paid him" for development of the game. Jobs subsequently gave Wozniak $375, saying Atari Inc. paid him $750 for the game. Wozniak later found out that Atari Inc. actually paid Jobs $5,000 for the game.

Right after designing the Apple I (1976), Wozniak set about designing the Apple II (1977). He says that all the ideas for improving the computer came to him while he was designing the Apple I, but he didn't implement them because he wanted to finish the Apple I in a timely manner. The Apple II featured several improvements over the Apple I, including real color graphics and six expansion slots (an idea he and Jobs disagreed over). It also had a real case, something the Apple I lacked.

About this time, Jobs and Wozniak searched for someone to head their company, and finally found Mike Markkula. Markkula was convinced Apple would be a Fortune 500 company within five years. Wozniak, however, was unconvinced. Markkula said that Wozniak would have to leave his job at HP. Wozniak was reluctant to do so, since he wanted to be an engineer and not a manager. He finally agreed to do so after an old friend told him he could join Apple and still be an engineer.

The Apple II had a working cassette tape interface, for secondary storage. Markkula was frustrated with the slow operation of the cassette tapes and their instability. He asked Wozniak to develop another method of secondary storage. Wozniak settled on the floppy disk, a new idea at the time.

Wozniak ends his book with advice to others, particularly the youth, on how to develop their own inventions and encourages them to ignore the mainstream and follow their own passions and ideas.

== Translations ==
The book has been translated into French, German, Polish, Portuguese, Russian, Spanish, Ukrainian, and Thai.
