= Logitech Harmony =

Line of smart remotes and home automation products made by Logitech

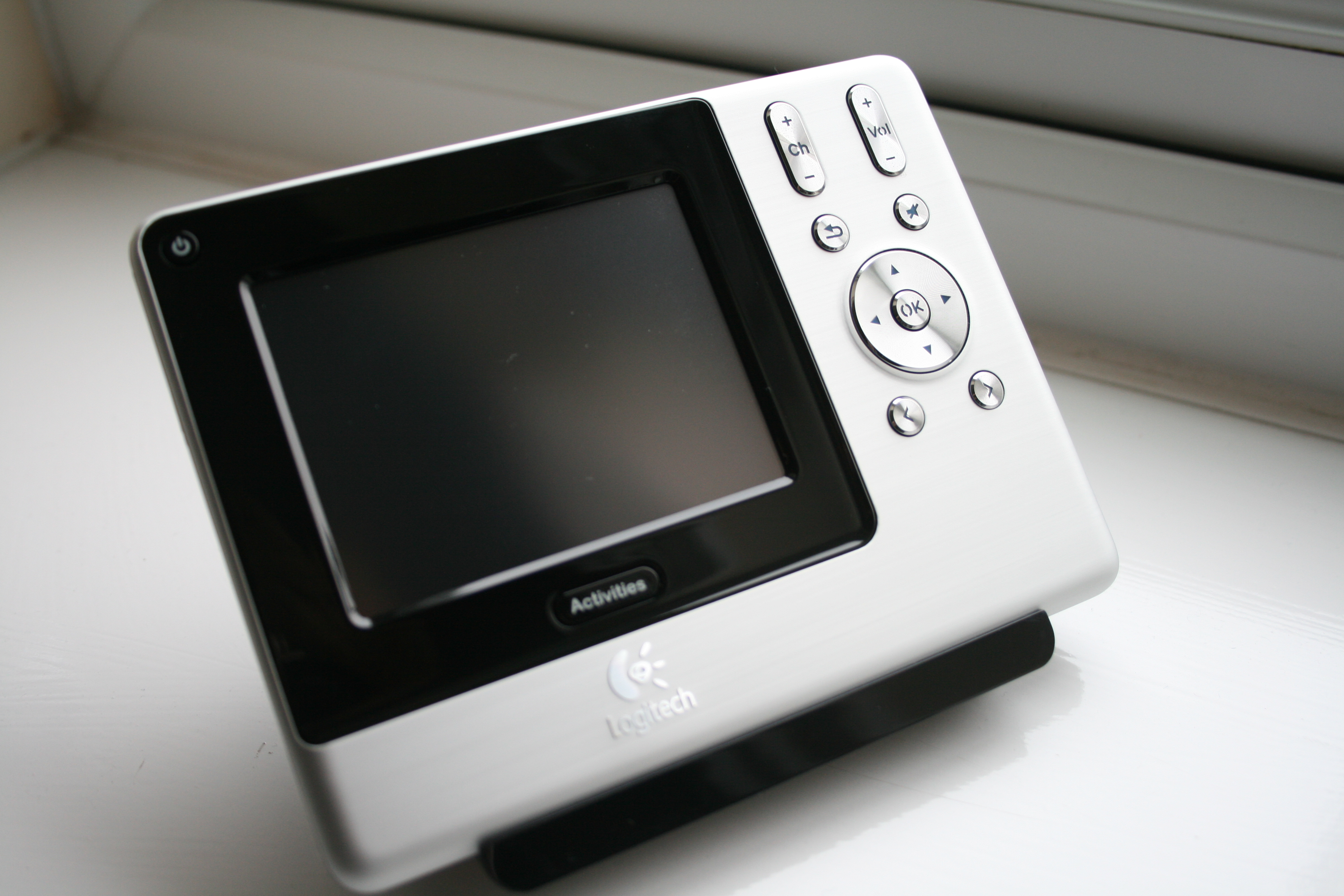
Logitech Harmony 1000

Logitech Harmony is a line of remote controls and home automation products formerly produced by Logitech. The line includes universal remote products designed for controlling the components of home theater systems (including televisions, set-top boxes, DVD and Blu-ray players, video game consoles) and other devices that can be controlled via infrared, as well as newer smart home hub products that can be used to additionally control supported Internet of things (IoT) and Smart home products, and allow the use of mobile apps to control devices. Logitech stopped manufacturing Harmony remotes in 2021 and discontinued support for older models in 2025.

== History ==
The Harmony remote control was originally created in 2001 by Easy Zapper, a Canadian company, and first sold in November 2001. The company later changed its name to Intrigue Technologies and was located in Mississauga, Ontario, Canada. Computer peripheral manufacturer Logitech acquired it in May 2004 for US$29 million.

In April 2021, Logitech announced the decision to discontinue the manufacturing of Harmony remotes. In 2025, they announced that support for older models that depended on the Harmony Remote software would end on May 28, 2025. As of 2025, models that are compatible with the newer MyHarmony app are still supported.

== Features ==
All Harmony remotes are set up online using an external configuration software. For all models this can be done using a computer running Microsoft Windows or MacOS to which they need to be connected via USB cable; the Elite and Ultimate models can also be configured wirelessly using a smartphone app for Android or iOS.

Each remote has infrared (IR) learning capability (some later models also include RF support), and can upload information about a new remote to an online device database. As of 2012 5000+ brands of devices were supported.

All Harmony remotes support one-touch activity-based control, which allows control of multiple devices at once. For example, a home theater setup might include a TV, a digital set top box and a home theater sound system. Pressing the 'Watch TV' activity button on the remote will turn on the TV, turn on digital set top box, turn on the sound system, switch the input of TV to the digital set top box and switch the input of the sound system to the set top box. In addition, the volume buttons would be mapped to the sound system, the channel buttons would be mapped to the digital set top box, and other controls to the most appropriate system component for the activity. The remote would remember which devices were powered on or off and which inputs devices had previously been switched to, allowing it to transition the devices from one activity to another without sending redundant or incorrect commands.

== Programming ==
Older-model Harmony remotes used Harmony Remote software, which allowed users to update the remote configuration, learn IR commands, and upgrade the remote control's firmware.

Version 6 of the software required a web browser; newer versions are Java-based. The software required constant Internet connectivity while programming the remote, as remote control codes were downloaded from Logitech. This method allowed updates to the product database, remote codes, and macro sequences to be easily distributed. This also allowed Logitech to survey their market to determine which products to investigate and research. Harmony Remote software was available for Microsoft Windows and Mac OS X.

On March 31, 2010, Logitech launched a new website and app called "MyHarmony" which replaced the Harmony Remote software for newer-model remotes. The Harmony 700 and Harmony One remotes were compatible with either software. Other remotes from 2009 and earlier were only compatible with Harmony Remote, while later remotes were only compatible with MyHarmony.

In 2025, Logitech announced that support for older models that depended on the Harmony Remote software would end on May 28, 2025. Remotes will continue to work, but can no longer be reprogrammed. Models that are compatible with the MyHarmony app can still be programmed.

== Products ==
Harmony remote model numbers are not sequential, but are grouped into "series" reflecting their cost and performance.

200 and 300 series
Released after 2010, these are very basic universal remotes that use the Harmony software and design.
500 series
Released between 2005 and 2008, the 500-series remotes are mid-range products with a squared-off physical design. These remotes offered control of up to 15 devices at a more affordable price than some later models. The remotes have a back-lit monochrome LCD screen.
600 series
These mid-range remotes have an "hourglass" shape designed to fit well in the hand.
700 series
The 700-series remotes offer higher performance than the 500 and 600 series models. They were released throughout the time Harmony remotes were produced. They came in various shapes.
800–1000 series
These remotes were high-end products aimed at audiophiles with complex audiovisual systems to control.
Home automation products
Logitech released a variety of products designed for control of home automation as well as audiovisual systems. Many of these products had names rather than model numbers.

=== First generation ===
First-generation Harmony remotes use the Harmony Remote software, rather than the MyHarmony software used by newer models. In March 2025, Logitech announced that it was dropping support for its first-generation Harmony remotes. As a result, it is no longer possible to reprogram these remotes.

==== 2004–2006 ====
Harmony 520
The Harmony 520 is a mid-range remote with a squared-off physical design compared to the hourglass design of the 6xx series. It has a blue back-light and monochrome LCD screen. These 5xx models are equipped with an infrared learning port to learn IR signals of unsupported or unknown devices. By pointing an original remote control at the Harmony's learning port, it is able to copy and reproduce those codes and, in the case of supported devices, it is able to figure out what the remote is used to control and imports that device. They require 4 AAA batteries. A mini USB port is used to connect these to a computer for programming. The 520 was sold in the United States. It can control up to 15 devices.
Harmony 525
The Harmony 525 is the European version of the 520. It has 50 buttons compared to the 520's 46. The added buttons are red, green, yellow and blue buttons that are used for things like teletext and PVR control. The 525 can control up to 15 devices.
Harmony 550
The harmony 550 remote is a variant of the 520 remote, made of higher-grade materials with different colors. It has 52 buttons. The added buttons are up arrow, down arrow, A, B, and sound and picture buttons that change the button mapping on the remote, allowing for reuse of the same physical buttons for a different set of functions. The remote has a blue backlight.
Harmony 555
The Harmony 555 is the European version of the 550 with four color buttons like the 525 instead of the up/down arrow and A/B buttons. The backlight is orange.
Harmony for Xbox 360
This member of the 5xx series was marketed as a companion to the Xbox 360. It runs the same software as other 5xx-series remotes. The Harmony 360 is pre-configured to be used with the Xbox 360 console and has special buttons, X, Y, A, B and media center control, correlating with the buttons on native Xbox controllers. It has a back-lit LCD screen and uses four AAA batteries.
The hardware layout is mostly the same as the 550, but with the extra up/down arrows of the 550 removed to make room for the colored X, Y, A and B buttons beneath the play and pause rows. The Harmony for Xbox 360 has the most hardware buttons of any in the 500 series: 54, counting the four direction arrow keys. It can control up to 12 devices.
Harman/Kardon TC 30
The Harman/Kardon TC 30 appears to be a redesigned, rebranded Harmony 52x with a cradle and a color LCD. The LCD has eight items compared to the four of the rest of the Harmony 5xx series. Images exist of the TC 30 both with and without the teletext color buttons, indicating that there were separate American and European versions. It seems to require different software from the Logitech branded remotes — the software was available from Logitech via harmonyremote.com.
Harmony 720
The Harmony 720 was initially offered exclusively through Costco in 2006 and featured a color screen and backlit keys. It was designed as an inexpensive replacement for the earlier Harmony 880, with few differences except for the ergonomic design and key layout. It was later made available through other vendors, but was not listed on Logitech's product page.
The Harmony 720 remote is closely related to the 500 series, with a square shape and a layout akin to those remotes. The buttons above the LCD are similar to those on the Harmony 525. The 720 has a colour LCD with six buttons/activities instead of four. The eight play/stop etc. buttons have been moved to the lower part. The Mute and Prev buttons have been moved and in their place there are extra up and down buttons as on the 550. Compared to the 500 series, the glow button has been removed. These remotes do not have the Sound and Picture buttons to change key mappings, like the 550/555 remotes do. Lacking red, green, yellow and blue colour buttons, the 720 has 49 buttons. It can control up to 12 devices.
Harmony 745
Logitech sold the original Easy Zapper Harmony remote for a while as the Harmony 745. It had much of the functionality of later models and could control up to 15 devices, but lacked the stylish design of later models.
Harmony 880
The Harmony 880 was the first Harmony with a color LCD screen and a rechargeable battery. There was a short-lived 880Pro that had the picture and sound buttons. This remote did not feature multi-room/multi-controller support like the 890Pro.
Harmony 885
The Harmony 885 is the European version of the 880, with four color keys used for Teletext and some set-top boxes instead of the up and down arrow keys.
Harmony 890/895
The Harmony 890/895 is the same as the 880/885, but it adds radio frequency (RF) capability, enabling the remote to control devices even without line-of-sight to and from different rooms, up to a range of 30 meters. This remote control cannot control proprietary RF devices, but it can control special Z-Wave RF devices, as well as IR devices without line-of-sight via the RF extender.
Harmony 890Pro
The 890Pro adds multi-room and multi-controller support, as well as a different color scheme. (Primary and secondary remotes can be set up that work with the same wireless extender) It also adds two buttons — picture and sound — that allow for quick access to picture- and sound-related commands. It was not listed on the Logitech Web site and was sold through custom installation companies. The 890Pro was not shipped with the RF extender.

==== 2008–2009 ====
Harmony 510/515
The Harmony 510/515 is an entry-level remote. It has the same number of buttons as the 525 and features colored buttons typical on most satellite boxes. It has a four-button, monochrome LCD. This remote is software-limited to controlling up to five devices. Like its mid-range cousins, the 520 and 550, it has no recharge pod and uses AAA batteries instead. Despite only supporting up to five devices, this model sold for the same price as earlier 500-series models. The difference between the 510 and 515 is that the 510 is black, while the 515 is silver.
Harmony 610
The Harmony 610 is similar to the Harmony 620 and Harmony 670, but is black with a silver face panel. The 610 can control a maximum of 5 devices.
Harmony 620
The Harmony 620 is similar to the Harmony 670, but comes in black instead of silver/black. The 620 can control up to 12 devices.
Harmony 628
The Harmony 628 could control up to 12 devices.
Harmony 655

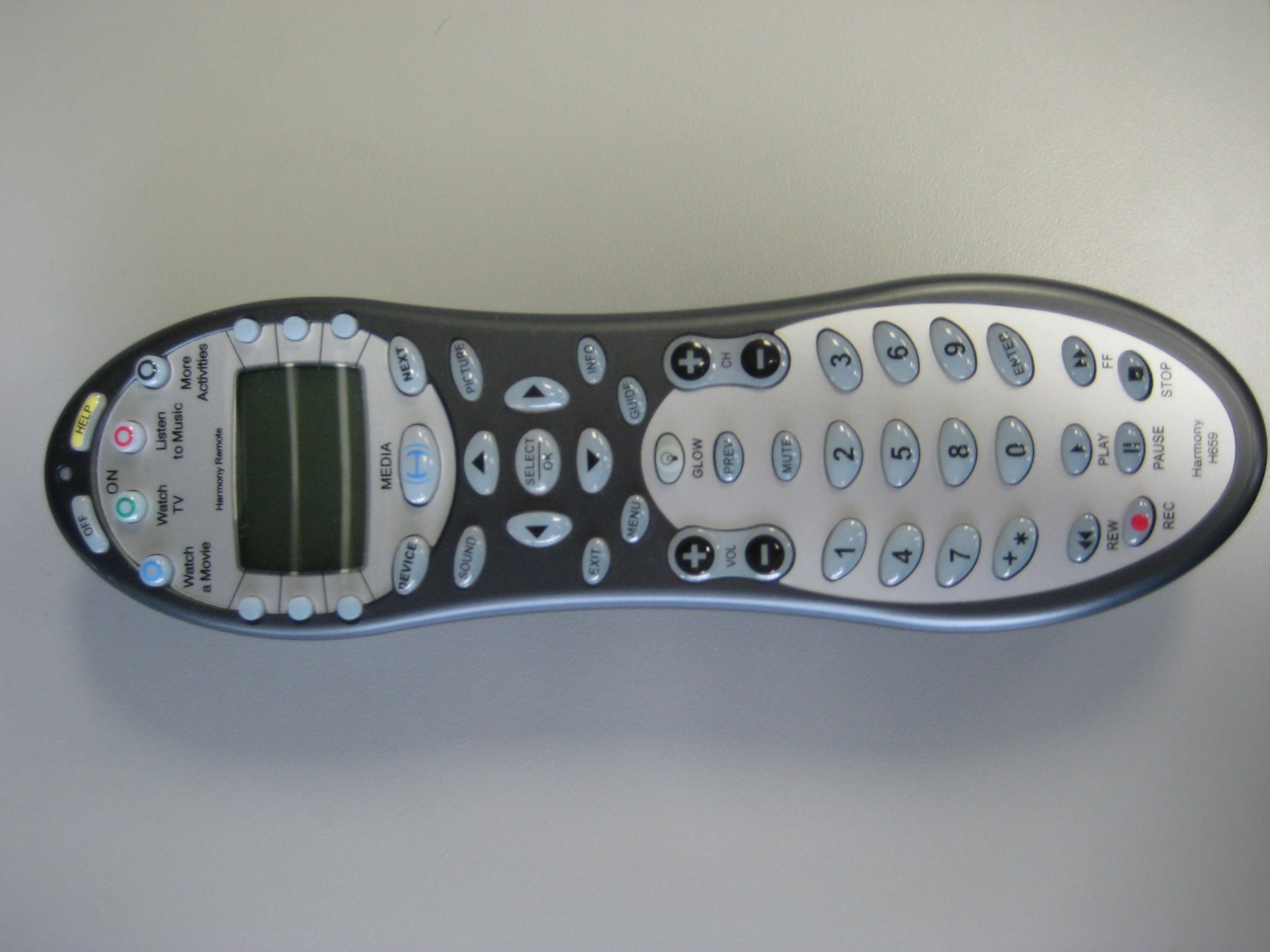
Harmony 659 remote

Harmony 659
The Harmony 659 is a mid-range universal remote that offers most of the functionality in the Harmony line. It has a monochrome LCD screen and can control up to 15 devices.

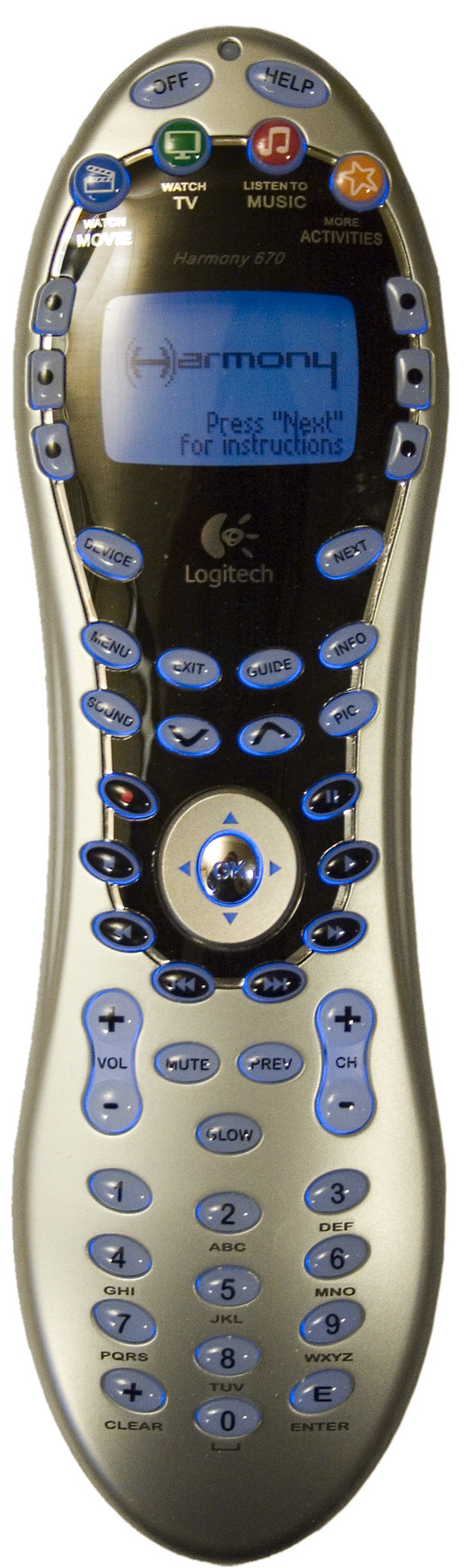
Harmony 670

Harmony 670
The Harmony 670 is a mid-range universal remote that offers most of the functionality in the Harmony line. The 670 has a monochrome LCD screen and puts DVR functions in the middle of the remote.
Harmony 675
Harmony 676
The Harmony 676 has a monochrome screen and can control up to 15 devices.
Harmony 680
The Harmony 680 is a mid-range remote. It has a backlit monochrome LCD screen and buttons specific to media PCs. Unlike many newer Harmony remotes, the 680 is able to control up to 15 devices.
Harmony 688
The Harmony 688 is a mid-range remote. It has a monochrome LCD screen that is backlit by a blue electroluminescent sheet, and can control up to 15 devices.

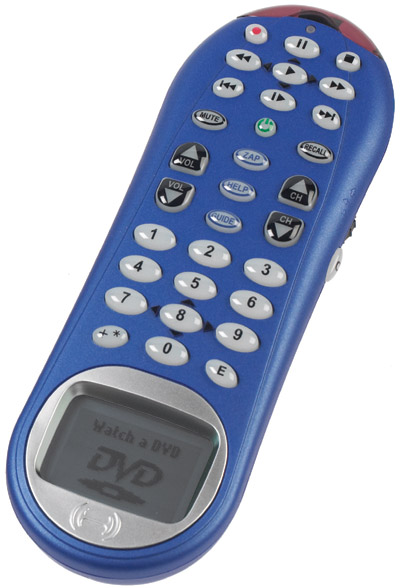
Harmony 768: capsule-shaped, with a clickable thumb-wheel

Harmony 748
The Harmony 748 is a capsule-shaped remote similar in design to the 768, but with a greatly reduced set of buttons. It can control up to 15 devices.
Harmony 768
The Harmony 768 is a capsule-shaped remote with a backlit LCD screen. It was available in silver, blue and red. It has 32 buttons, as well as a clickable thumb-wheel to scroll through and select activities.
Harmony 785
The harmony 785 is the European version of the 720. While the 720 has 49 buttons, the 785 has 53. The extra buttons are the red, green, yellow and blue colour buttons commonly used for things like teletext and PVR control. These are located above the number buttons, which are placed further down compared to the 720. Another difference from the 720 is that the 785 can control up to 15 devices.
Harmony 900
Harmony 900 has the same ergonomic design as the Harmony One. It adds four color buttons and supports RF control. The RF technology used by Harmony 900 is not compatible with Harmony 890, 1000, and 1100. The Harmony 900 does not support "sequences" (Logitech parlance for macros). Despite being released after the Harmony One, the 900 is not compatible with the MyHarmony software and can no longer be programmed.
Harmony 1000
The Harmony 1000 has customizable touch screen commands, sounds and a rechargeable battery, and allows control of up to 15 devices by IR and RF. An RF extender allowed control of IR devices out of line of sight. A maximum of two extenders can be configured within the software. An 1000i model without RF capability was also available.
Harmony 1100
Adds QVGA resolution to the touch screen and allows 15 devices to be controlled. The 1100 uses a Flash-based user interface rather than the Java-based one found in the Harmony 1000. An 1100i model without RF capability was also available.

=== Transitional models (2008–2009) ===
Harmony 700
Support for up to 6 devices. Color display. Rechargeable AA batteries via USB. Released in September 2009, this model is compatible with both the older Harmony Remote software and the MyHarmony software that was released in March 2010.
Harmony One
Released in January 2008, the Harmony One remote features a color touch screen and is rechargeable. It does not offer any RF capability. A 2008 CNET TV review called it one of the best universal remotes on the market. It is compatible with both the older Harmony Remote software and the MyHarmony software that was released in March 2010.

=== MyHarmony models ===
==== 2010–2012 ====
Harmony 200
This basic universal remote supports only one activity, Watch TV, and can control only three devices. It has no screen.
Harmony 300
This basic universal remote supports only one activity, Watch TV, and can control up to four devices. The remote supports customizable keys with remote features and favorite channels. This remote has no LCD and no battery charge pod. Requires two AA batteries.
Harmony 300i
Similar to the Harmony 300, but has a glossy finish rather than a matte finish.
Harmony 600
Support for up to 5 devices. Monochrome display. Requires 2 AA batteries.
Harmony 650
The lowest-cost version of the Harmony remote with a color display. It can be programmed with multiple activities and up to 8 devices.
Harmony Touch
The Harmony Touch remote control contains a full-color display screen with touch functionality. It is an IR remote that supports up to 15 devices and multiple activities. It lacks dedicated physical buttons for home automation control. This remote can be added to a Harmony Hub for additional functionality.
Harmony Link
A device which utilizes a mobile app as a remote to control devices within the room. It was later replaced by the Harmony Hub product, which also supports controlling smart home products. On November 8, 2017, Logitech announced that it would end support for the Harmony Link and make the devices inoperable after March 18, 2018, citing an expired security certificate for a component in the platform. Following criticism of Logitech's originally-announced plan to do so for users whose devices were still under warranty, Logitech announced on November 10, 2017, that it would exchange all Harmony Links for Harmony Hubs free-of-charge, regardless of warranty status.

==== 2013–2020 ====
Harmony 350
An updated version of the 300 that can control up to 8 devices in particular categories and supports only one activity: Watch TV. Like the 300, this model lacks a display screen.
Harmony 665
Has a color display and can control up to ten devices.
Harmony Smart Control
Includes a Harmony Home Hub and a simple remote control that contains three activity buttons used to activate up to 6 different activities. The simple remote lacks a display screen, and could also be purchased separately for those who already own a Harmony Home Hub. Supports up to 8 devices.
Harmony Ultimate One/Harmony Ultimate
The Harmony Ultimate One remote control is a revised version of the Harmony Touch adding motion-activated backlit keys, eyes-free gesture control, tilt sensor and vibration feedback. This remote can be added to a Harmony Hub for additional functionality. The Harmony Ultimate was a bundle containing both the Harmony Ultimate One remote control and the Harmony Hub.
Harmony Hub
This device is not a remote, but rather a hub that can control IR and Bluetooth devices, as well as certain smart home devices (e.g. Philips Hue, Nest thermostat). It is controlled by certain Harmony remotes as well iOS/Android based apps, and more recently Alexa can control certain functions. By itself, it can control up to 8 home theater devices and an amount of home automation devices. A lot of the current products include this along with the remote. This replaces the older Harmony Home Hub and Harmony Link devices.
Harmony 950/Harmony Elite/Harmony Pro
This was the top of the Harmony range available via retail. The Harmony 950 is a redesigned version of the Harmony Ultimate One with the addition of dedicated physical buttons for home automation control. Other changes include the media transport control buttons being relocated to a more ergonomic location, and the addition of user accessible battery compartment. This remote can be added to a Harmony Hub for additional functionality. The Harmony Elite is a bundle containing both the Harmony 950 remote control and the Harmony Hub. The Harmony Pro is the Harmony Elite bundle sold for professional installers.
Harmony Ultimate Home
Includes the Harmony Home Hub and a remote similar to the above described Harmony Ultimate One. The package includes four IR emitters, the remote, the hub, and two IR extenders that plug into the hub. Pressing a button on the included remote or any add-on remote will first communicate with the hub, then the hub will tell one of the four IR emitters based on configuration (including the IR emitter on the remote) to transmit the command. Harmony Ultimate Home also contains home automation controls, unlike the Ultimate One. The remote can't be purchased separately for Home Hub owners, unlike most of the other remotes that include it. It supports a maximum of 15 devices.
Harmony Pro 2400
The Pro 2400 is the only Harmony product that includes a hub with an Ethernet port, as well as power over Ethernet (POE) support. The hub is significantly wider, and comes with a detachable directional antenna. It also has six, 3.5mm jacks for IR sensors (versus two, 2.5 mm jacks on other Hub products). It uses the Elite remote, and is only available through professional installers.
Harmony Express
The Express uses Amazon Alexa to navigate, via a smaller distinct remote. It is the only Harmony remote that supports voice-activated search.
Harmony Companion (formerly Harmony Home Control)
Like the Harmony Smart Control described above, but the included Simple Remote also contains home automation controls. Like the Smart Control Simple Remote, the included remote lacks a display screen, but it cannot be purchased for Home Hub owners unlike the Smart Control remote.
Harmony Smart Keyboard
This includes the Harmony Hub along with a keyboard containing a built-in touchpad. The keyboard appears to be like Logitech's previous K400 keyboard and touchpad combo, except some of the keys and buttons have been replaced with others more useful to a home theater remote, and two numbered, Harmony-specific USB receivers are included. It lacks a display screen, supports three activities (Watch a Movie, Watch TV, and Listen to Music), and can also be purchased as an add-on accessory for Harmony Home Hub owners. It controls up to 8 devices.

=== Accessories ===
E-R0001
The Harmony E-R0001 is an IR to Bluetooth adapter for the PS3.
RF Wireless Extender
The Harmony RF Wireless Extender allows some Harmony remotes, e.g., models 890, 1000 and 1100, to control devices using radio frequencies instead of infrared, with longer range than infrared and no need for line-of-sight transmission. The Harmony 1000 can use two RF Extenders, while the 1100 can use multiple extenders.
IR Extender System
The Harmony IR Extender System has an IR blaster and a set of mini blasters, and does not require programming. It is manufactured by Philips and rebadged.

== See also ==
- Universal Remote Controls - General Article on Universal Remote Controls.
- JP1 remote - Universal Electronics/One For All range of programmable remotes
