= CL 9 =

American consumer electronics company (1985–1988)

- Industry: Consumer electronics
- Founded: 1985
- Founder: Steve Wozniak
- Defunct: 1988
- Fate: Sold
- Key people: Steve Wozniak
- Products: CORE remote control
- Owner: Steve Wozniak

CL 9 was a company that developed a universal TV remote control. It was started by Steve Wozniak, co-founder of Apple Inc. and designer of the Apple I and Apple II personal computers. CL 9 was in business for three years, from 1985 to 1988, launching the 6502-based CL 9 CORE remote control in 1987, which Wozniak calls the first programmable universal remote control.

== History ==
Wozniak was working at Apple Computer as an Apple II engineer. He enjoyed his work, but he believed he was not making a valuable contribution because of his role as an Apple spokesperson and because it had become a big company.

Apple was a large company, and it wasn't and still isn't the love in my life. The love in my life is starting small companies with small groups of friends. Bringing new ideas out and trying to build them.

At the same time, Wozniak had a state-of-the-art home theater in the Santa Cruz Mountains, made of myriad devices, each from different manufacturers and with a unique remote control. The frustrating complexity inspired him to invent what is now known as a universal remote. He got some friends interested, and started a new company to build the device.

Wozniak decided to leave Apple to pursue his new venture, but stated that he "never felt like I was turning my back on my own company". Of his decision to leave, he informed his manager's manager, Wayne Rosing, but not his friend and Apple co-founder, Steve Jobs. Wozniak guessed that Jobs first heard the news from an article in The Wall Street Journal. When Wozniak spoke to the reporter, he was very direct about the fact that he was not leaving because he was disgruntled with Apple, but that he was excited to build this remote control. The reporter nevertheless included some of Wozniak's criticisms of Apple, which created discord. Wozniak says "it was an accident, but it's been picked up by every book and every bit of history." Wozniak left Apple but remained a paid employee indefinitely, though at the lowest pay tier.

=== Development ===
Wozniak lived in the Summit Road area of the Santa Cruz Mountains. The two restaurants were the Summit Inn and Cloud 9. He heard Cloud 9 was going out of business, so he suggested that as a site for the new company. Two weeks later, they instead settled into an older area of nearby Los Gatos. Co-founder Joe Ennis noticed the name Cloud 9 and investigated its availability. It was taken, so the name CL 9 was chosen.

Wozniak mentioned the new company to an early investor in Apple, who asked to be allowed to invest. Wozniak resisted, saying they were not looking for investors. But the investor pleaded, so Wozniak allowed it. Several of the investor's friends invested two to three million dollars. About this time, Wozniak asked an old friend from Commodore, Sam Bernstein, to be president.

The company produced a great deal of research and development. They were frustrated in some of their early efforts by interference from Apple co-founder, Jobs. The product's case was originally designed by Frog Design, which also worked for Apple and Jobs would not allow Frog to do work for CL 9. They overcame these setbacks with a successful design. When it was near completion, with just the software programming to be done, Wozniak pulled back. He hired another programmer to do the work so he could spend more time with his children.

=== Intellectual property ===
The product's name "Core" caused confusion in the marketplace with electronic and software from another well-known company. "Core" is a domestic and international registered trademark of Core International, Inc, now owned by Sony, for computers, computer peripherals, and computer programs. After a legal settlement, the product was to be renamed and already manufactured items were to carry a disclaimer notice informing users it was not from Core International, Inc.

The technology for CORE was patented by Wozniak and Charles H. Van Dusen, a CL 9 employee, for CL 9. United States Patent number 4918439 was filed on October 5, 1988, and expired in 2005.

=== Successor company ===
The CORE remote control was marketed by Robert Retzlaff and David Peters of Celadon. "The Celadon company later took over the CORE in 1991 and renamed it the PIC-100 after CL 9 closed its doors in 1988. It marketed the PIC-100 until they updated it as the PIC-200—this used FLASH technology."

=== Company sale ===
Sale of the business, technology, and patents was negotiated in 1988. "CL 9's product, called Core, can operate stereo, television, and other video equipment from a single, hand-held unit, but sales have been slow because of lower-priced units from established consumer electronics companies." Wozniak planned to act on his lifelong goal of teaching elementary school. Martin Spergel was CL 9's president and chief executive at the time of the sale.

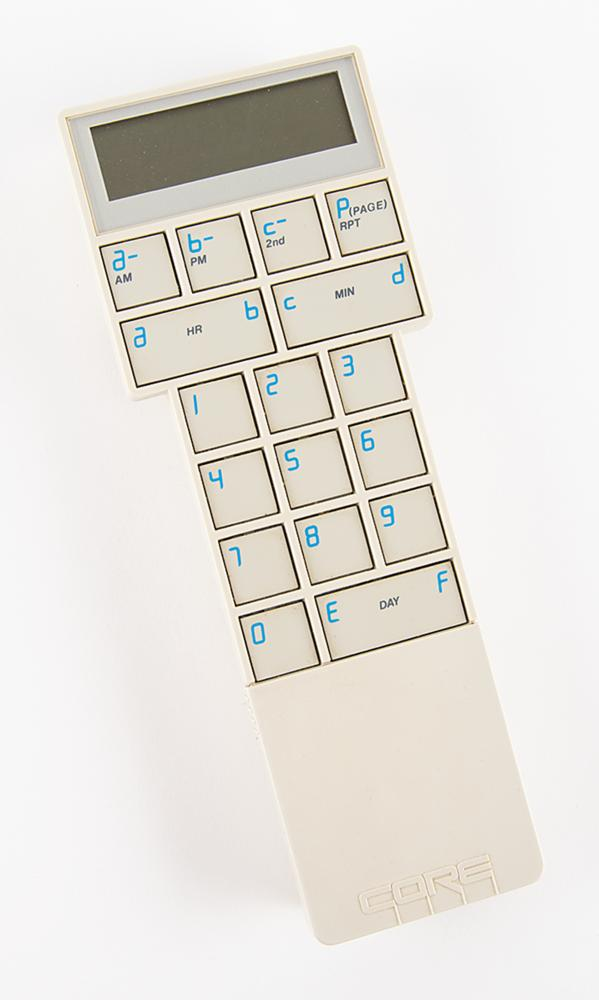
Photo of the CORE remote control.

== CORE remote control ==
The CORE generic universal remote control is able to learn, or record, IR signal patterns from other remote controls. It has an LCD, a 4-bit and an 8-bit 6502-based microprocessor, and 16 keys plus a few more control buttons. Sixteen pages of codes are available, for a total of 256 keyable codes; each of these 256 keys can reference any other combination of keys, allowing full macros. The device has a time clock, allowing codes to be sent at any future time. A serial interface can connect to a computer.

Its generic numeric keypad allows it to readily handle any task, but Wozniak said users preferred the more comfortable and specialized TV and VCR keys of standard remote controls.

The CORE uses both AAA batteries and a special internal battery soldered to the circuit board. If the internal battery runs down, the firmware is lost. After replacing the internal battery, the firmware must be reloaded using the serial interface.
