= New Internet Computer =

New Internet Computer (NIC)
- Manufacturer: New Internet Computer Company
- Type: Internet Appliance
- Released: July 6, 2000; 26 years ago
- Introductory price: $199
- Discontinued: June 2003
- Units sold: Less than 50,000
- Operating system: Linux
- CPU: 266 MHz Cyrix MII
- Memory: 64 MB of RAM
- Storage: 4 MB of flash memory
- Connectivity: 10 MBps Ethernet; 56K Modem; Two USB 1.1 ports
- Power: 60 Watt power supply
- Online services: NetZero

The New Internet Computer (NIC) was a Linux-based internet appliance released July 6, 2000 by Larry Ellison and Gina Smith's New Internet Computer Company. The system (without a monitor) sold for US$199.

The NIC boots from a CD-ROM with a custom Linux distribution developed by Wim Coekaerts. It has no hard drive and no way to install additional software. The system's only non-volatile storage is 4 MB of flash memory.

Ellison planned to sell 5 million units the first year, but fewer than 50,000 units were sold. The company shut its doors in June 2003. PC World ranked the NIC as the ninth worst PC of all time.
