= Woz U =

Tech education company founded by Steve Wozniak

- Website type: Online education
- Available in: English
- Founded: October 13, 2017
- Website: woz-u.com
- Registration: Required

Woz U is a company founded by Apple co-founder Steve Wozniak that focuses on technical education for independent students, and offers curriculum to universities and organizations to upskill their employees.

== Background ==
WOZ U was founded in October 2017 by Apple co-founder Steve Wozniak. Wozniak was inspired by his own experience of teaching 5th Grade students in California. Woz U received the school license from the Arizona state board. In the first year, the school had 350 students, as confirmed by the Arizona State Board for Private Post secondary Education.

In fall of 2018, a CBS News investigation of Woz U cast some doubts on the professionalism of the expensive curriculum. CBS interviewed two dozen current and former students and employees, who shared their dissatisfaction with the content quality, such as documentation typos leading to confusing program errors, while some promised live lectures were actually recorded and out-of-date. One student described the 33-week online program as "a $13,000 e-book". A former "enrollment counselor" described a high-pressure sales environment, which the company denied. In a prepared statement, Woz U president Chris Coleman admitted the documentation errors and said quality control efforts were being implemented, and said curriculum was reviewed by Wozniak. The founder declined interview requests, then dodged a reporter's unannounced appearance at a conference.

== Product and services ==
=== Courses ===
Woz U offers courses in Software Development, Cyber Security and Data Science that lasts approximately 33 weeks, with one to two hours of lectures a week. These courses provide graded assignments, weekly exercises, and a final project. As of March 2019, Woz U offered three technology-focused educational models for Software Development, Cyber Security and Data Science.

=== Business model ===
Woz U works on the Education-as-a-Service (EaaS) model to students an alternative or supplement to the traditional four-year degree programs. The students take a micro course to learn software development, cyber security and data science. As of December 2018, Woz U had 350 registered students signed up for its programs. Woz U charges $13,200 to $13,800 as a fee from the students for the courses.

It also partners with businesses to offer a technical curriculum to employees in order to meet the upskill demand for the technology based workforce.

== Partnerships ==
Woz U has launched career pathway programs via STEAM initiatives to school districts across the United States. It also works with colleges and universities across the United States. University partners include University of North Dakota, University of the Potomac, Belhaven University and New Jersey Institute of Technology. It enables University partners to incorporate the Woz U technical curriculum into traditional college and university coursework.

Woz U also works directly with businesses to upskill their employees in Software Development, Cyber Security and Data Science, to remain current with the technology developments.
