= Steve Wozniak =

American engineer and programmer (born 1950)

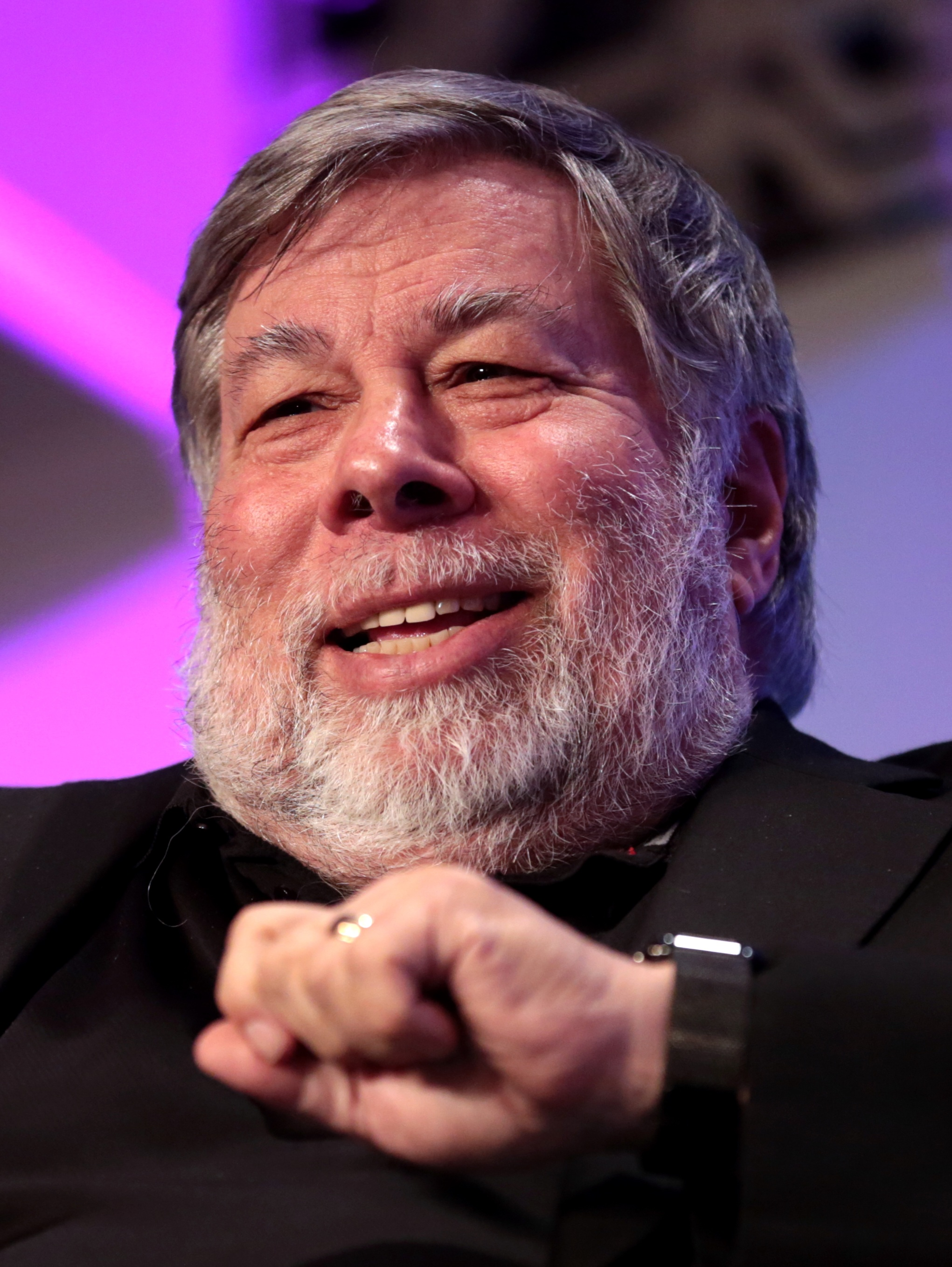
- Wozniak in 2017
- Born: Stephan Gary Wozniak; August 11, 1950 (age 76); San Jose, California, U.S.
- Other names: Woz; Berkeley Blue (hacking alias); Rocky Clark (student alias)
- Citizenship: United States; Poland; Serbia
- Education: University of California, Berkeley (BS)
- Occupations: Entrepreneur; electrical engineer; programmer; inventor; investor
- Years active: 1971–present
- Known for: Pioneering the personal computer revolution with Steve Jobs; Co-founding Apple; Creating or co-creating the Apple I, Apple II, and Macintosh
- Spouses: Alice Robertson (m. 1976; div. 1980) Candice Clark (m. 1981; div. 1987) Suzanne Mulkern (m. 1990; div. 2004) Janet Hill (m. 2008)
- Children: 3
- Call sign: ex-WA6BND (ex-WV6VLY)
- Website: woz.org

Stephen Gary Wozniak (/ˈwɒzniæk/; born August 11, 1950), also known by his nickname Woz, is an American technology entrepreneur, electrical engineer, computer programmer, and inventor. Wozniak co-founded Apple Computer Company (now Apple Inc.) in 1976 with his early business partner Steve Jobs. Through his work at Apple in the 1970s and 1980s, he became widely recognized as one of the most prominent pioneers of the personal computer revolution.

In 1975, Wozniak started developing the Apple I into the computer that launched Apple when he and Jobs first began marketing it the following year. He was the primary designer of the Apple II, introduced in 1977, known as one of the first highly successful mass-produced microcomputers, while Jobs oversaw the development of its foam-molded plastic case and early Apple employee Rod Holt developed its switching power supply.

With human–computer interface expert Jef Raskin, Wozniak had a major influence over the initial development of the original Macintosh concepts from 1979 to 1981, when Jobs took over the project following Wozniak's brief departure from the company due to a traumatic airplane accident. After permanently leaving Apple in 1985, Wozniak founded CL 9 and created the first programmable universal remote, released in 1987. He then pursued several other business and philanthropic ventures throughout his career, focusing largely on technology in K–12 schools, which involved a 1990 initiative to place computers in schools in the former Soviet Union.

Wozniak has received numerous awards and honors for his work in philanthropy and the tech industry, including an induction into the National Inventors Hall of Fame in 2000. As of June 2024, Wozniak has remained an employee of Apple in a ceremonial capacity since stepping down in 1985. In recent years, he has helped fund multiple entrepreneurial efforts dealing in areas such as GPS and telecommunications, flash memory, technology and pop culture conventions, technical education, ecology, satellites and more. In addition to his American citizenship, Wozniak is also a Polish and Serbian citizen.

== Early life ==
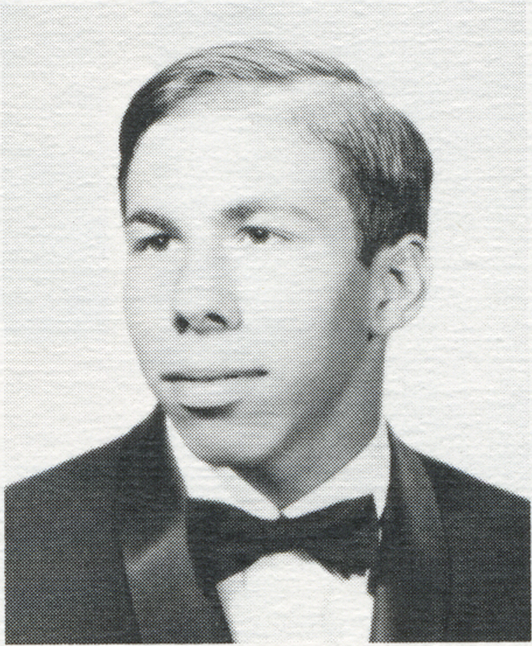
Wozniak's 1968 Homestead High School yearbook photo

Stephen Gary Wozniak was born on August 11, 1950, in San Jose, California. His mother, Margaret Louise Wozniak (née Kern) (1923–2014), was from Washington state, and his father, Francis Jacob "Jerry" Wozniak (1925–1994) of Michigan, was an engineer for the Lockheed Corporation. Wozniak graduated from Homestead High School in 1968, in Cupertino, California. Steve has one brother, Mark, a former tech executive who lives in Menlo Park. He also has one sister, Leslie, who attended Homestead High School in Cupertino. She is a grant adviser at Five Bridges Foundation, which helps at-risk youths in San Francisco. Leslie said it was her mother who introduced activism to her and her siblings.

The name on Wozniak's birth certificate is "Stephan Gary Wozniak", but his mother said that she intended it to be spelled "Stephen", which is what he uses. Wozniak is of Polish, German, and Ukrainian ancestry. In the early 1970s, Wozniak's blue box design earned him the nickname "Berkeley Blue" in the phreaking community. Wozniak has credited watching Star Trek and attending Star Trek conventions while in his youth as a source of inspiration for his starting Apple Computer. In his autobiography, iWoz, he also credits the Tom Swift Jr. books as an inspiration for becoming an engineer.

== Career ==
=== Pre-Apple ===
In 1969, Wozniak returned to the San Francisco Bay Area after being expelled from the University of Colorado Boulder in his first year for hacking the university's computer system. He re-enrolled at De Anza College in Cupertino before transferring to the University of California, Berkeley, in 1971. In June of that year, for a self-taught engineering project, Wozniak designed and built his first computer with his friend Bill Fernandez.

Predating useful microprocessors, screens, and keyboards, and using punch cards and only 20 TTL chips donated by an acquaintance, they named it "Cream Soda" after their favorite beverage. A newspaper reporter stepped on the power supply cable and blew up the computer, but it served Wozniak as "a good prelude to my thinking 5 years later with the Apple I and Apple II computers". Before focusing his attention on Apple, he was employed at Hewlett-Packard (HP), where he designed calculators. It was during this time that he dropped out of Berkeley and befriended Steve Jobs.

Wozniak was introduced to Jobs by Fernandez, who attended Homestead High School with Jobs in 1971 and would eventually become Apple's first full-time employee. Jobs and Wozniak became friends when Jobs worked for the summer at HP, where Wozniak, too, was employed, working on a mainframe computer.

We first met in 1971 during my college years, while he was in high school. A friend said, 'you should meet Steve Jobs because he likes electronics, and he also plays pranks.' So he introduced us.

— Steve Wozniak

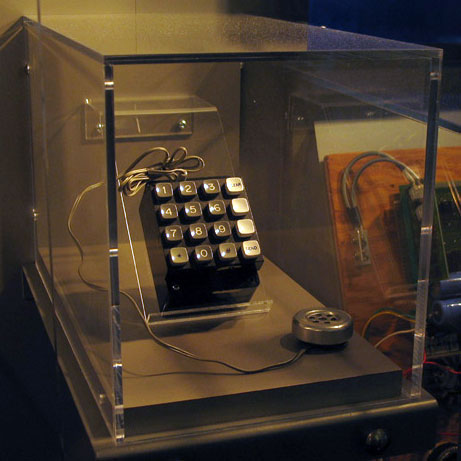
Steve Wozniak's blue box at the Computer History Museum

Their first business partnership began later that year when Wozniak read an article titled "Secrets of the Little Blue Box" from the October 1971 issue of Esquire, and started to build his own "blue boxes" that enabled one to make long-distance phone calls at no cost. Jobs, who handled the sales of the blue boxes, managed to sell some two hundred of them for $150 each, and split the profit with Wozniak. Jobs later told his biographer that if it had not been for Wozniak's blue boxes, "there wouldn't have been an Apple."

In 1973, Jobs was working for arcade game company Atari, Inc. in Los Gatos, California. He was assigned to create a circuit board for the arcade video game Breakout. According to Atari co-founder Nolan Bushnell, Atari offered $100 (equivalent to $725 in 2025) for each chip that was eliminated in the machine. Jobs had little knowledge of circuit board design and made a deal with Wozniak to split the fee evenly between them if Wozniak could minimize the number of chips. Wozniak reduced the number of chips by 50, by using RAM for the brick representation. Whilst a lack of scoring or coin mechanisms made Wozniak's prototype unusable, Jobs was paid the full bonus regardless. Jobs told Wozniak that Atari gave them only $700 and that Wozniak's share was thus $350 (equivalent to $2,500 in 2025). Wozniak did not learn about the actual $5,000 bonus (equivalent to $36,300 in 2025) until ten years later. While dismayed, he said that if Jobs had told him about it and had said he needed the money, Wozniak would have given it to him.

In 1975, Wozniak began designing and developing the computer that would eventually make him famous, the Apple I. With the Apple I, Wozniak was largely working to impress other members of the Palo Alto–based Homebrew Computer Club, a local group of electronics hobbyists interested in computing. The club was one of several key centers which established the home hobbyist era, essentially creating the microcomputer industry over the next few decades. Unlike other custom Homebrew designs, the Apple had an easy-to-achieve video capability that drew a crowd when it was unveiled.

==== Zaltair ====
Front page of Wozniak's parody Zaltair ad

Back page of the Zaltair ad

Wozniak also created the fictional computer Zaltair. Adam Schoolsky and Randy Wigginton helped him to pull it off at the West Coast Computer Conference. It was a parody of the Altair 8800 computer, which was very popular at the time. Steve Wozniak thought of the name because:

The company Zilog had come out with a compatible processor, which they called the Z-80. A few companies using this chip were establishing brands based on Z words. Like ComputerZ or Z-Node or the like.

As a joke, Wozniak decided to print "20,000 brochures" (according to YouTube video "Rare video of Steve Wozniak from 1984 talking about computing, joining Apple and the Mac" filmed at a Cleveland computer club meeting) of a fake product called the 'Zaltair' with a lot of "superlative descriptions of a computer that solved every problem in the world". It advertised, among other things, a new version of the BASIC programming language called "BAZIC", with the ability to "define your own language... a feature we call perZonality".

To help make the ad believable, he included fake trademarks and a shipping label for MITS, the company manufacturing the Altair. Wozniak did not think that this would be an issue, as he had "made sure in advance that MITS would not be at the show." However, it later turned out that a representative from MITS was attending, and had been taking large amounts of their fake brochures. He also made sure the article had a fake quote from Ed Roberts, then president of MITS, which spelled out the name of a rival company, Processor Technology, when looking at the first letter of every word, further ensuring that the article was not traced back to him.

Steve Jobs, Wozniak's close friend at the time, received a copy of the brochure. He fell for it, and even "took pride that the Apple II stacked up well against the Zaltair in the comparison chart". However, he, like many others, did not realize Wozniak had created the brochure until "Woz gave him a framed copy of the brochure as a birthday gift" in 1985.

=== Apple formation and success ===
Wozniak designed Apple's first products, the Apple I and II computers and he helped design the Macintosh — because he wanted to use them and they didn't exist.

— CNBC retrospective

Between Woz and Jobs, Woz was the innovator, the inventor. Steve Jobs was the marketing person.

— Apple employee #12 Daniel Kottke

Everything I did at Apple that was an A+ job and that took us places, I had two things in my favor ... I had no money [and] I had had no training.

— Steve Wozniak in 2010

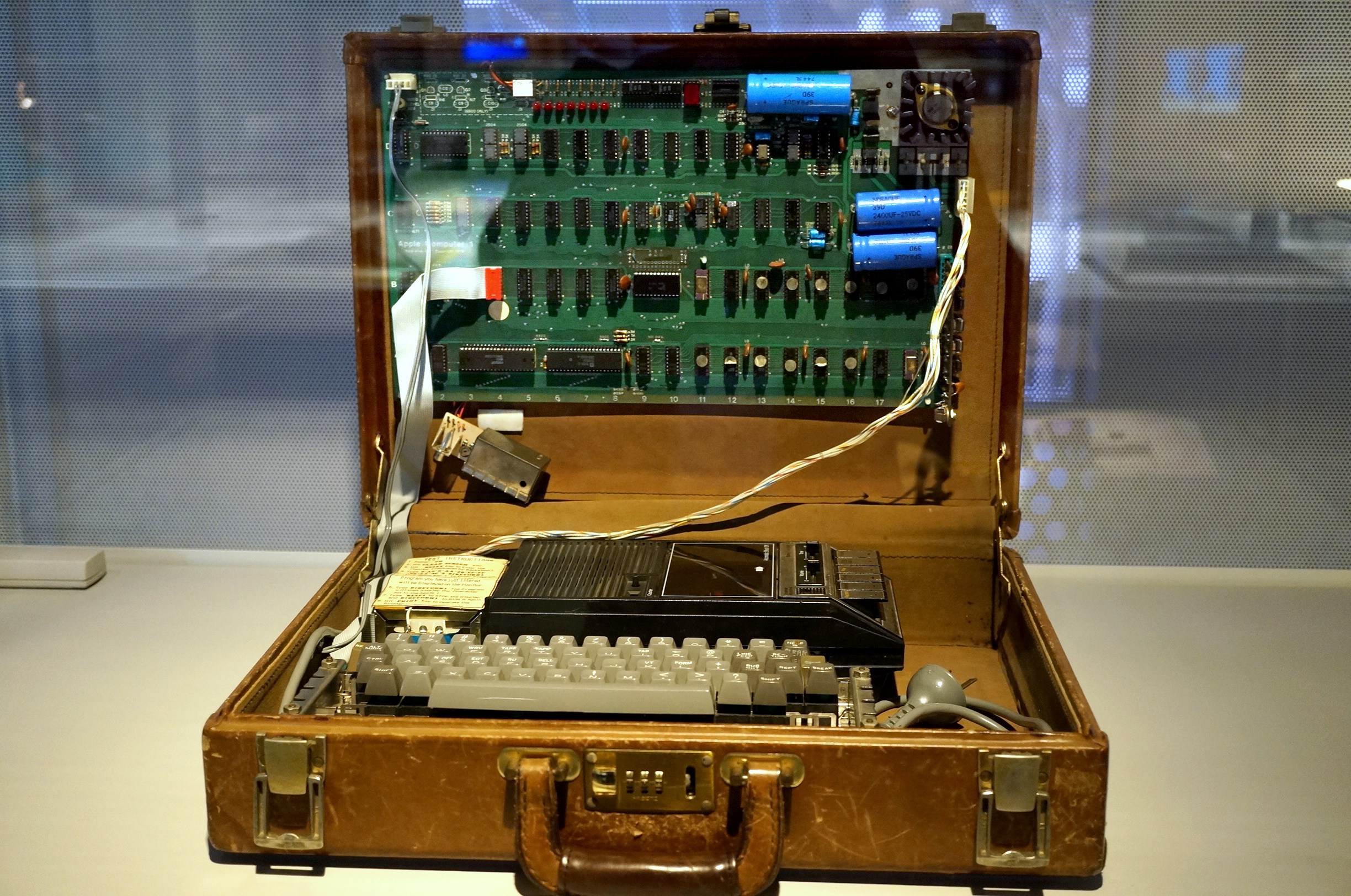
An original 1976 Apple I computer in a briefcase, from the Sydney Powerhouse Museum collection

By March 1, 1976, Wozniak completed the basic design of the Apple I computer. He alone designed the hardware, circuit board designs, and operating system for the computer. Wozniak originally offered the design to HP while working there, but was denied by the company on five occasions. Jobs then advised Wozniak to start a business of their own to build and sell bare printed circuit boards of the Apple I. Wozniak, at first skeptical, was later convinced by Jobs that even if they were not successful they could at least say to their grandchildren that they had had their own company. To raise the money they needed to build the first batch of the circuit boards, Wozniak sold his HP scientific calculator while Jobs sold his Volkswagen van.

On April 1, 1976, Jobs and Wozniak formed the Apple Computer Company (now called Apple Inc.) along with administrative supervisor Ronald Wayne, whose participation in the new venture was short-lived. The two decided on the name "Apple" shortly after Jobs returned from Oregon and told Wozniak about his time spent on an apple orchard there.

After the company was formed, Jobs and Wozniak made one last trip to the Homebrew Computer Club to give a presentation of the fully assembled version of the Apple I. Paul Terrell, who was starting a new computer shop in Mountain View, California, called the Byte Shop, saw the presentation and was impressed by the machine. Terrell told Jobs that he would order 50 units of the Apple I and pay $500 (equivalent to $2,830 in 2025) each on delivery, but only if they came fully assembled, as he was not interested in buying bare printed circuit boards.

Together the duo assembled the first boards in Jobs's parents' Los Altos home; initially in his bedroom and later (when there was no space left) in the garage. Wozniak's apartment in San Jose was filled with monitors, electronic devices, and computer games that he had developed. The Apple I sold for $666.66. Wozniak later said he had no idea about the relation between the number and the mark of the beast, and that he came up with the price because he liked "repeating digits". They sold their first 50 system boards to Terrell later that year.

External image
- Wozniak and Steve Jobs with an Apple I circuit board, c. 1976.

In November 1976, Jobs and Wozniak received substantial funding from a then-semi-retired Intel product marketing manager and engineer named Mike Markkula. At the request of Markkula, Wozniak resigned from his job at HP and became the vice president in charge of research and development at Apple. Wozniak's Apple I was similar to the Altair 8800, the first commercially available microcomputer, except the Apple I had no provision for internal expansion cards. With expansion cards, the Altair could attach to a computer terminal and be programmed in BASIC. In contrast, the Apple I was a hobbyist machine. Wozniak's design included a $25 CPU (MOS 6502) on a single circuit board with 256 bytes of ROM, 4K or 8K bytes of RAM, and a 40-character by 24-row display controller. Apple's first computer lacked a case, power supply, keyboard, and display—all components that had to be provided by the user. Eventually about 200 Apple I computers were produced in total.

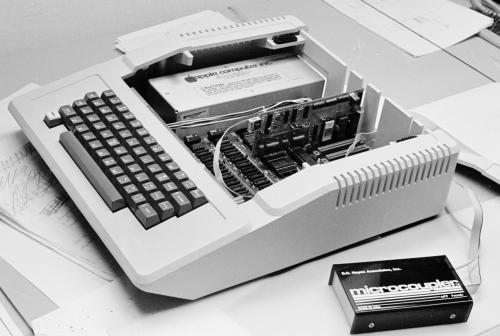
An Apple II computer with an external modem

After the success of the Apple I, Wozniak designed the Apple II, the first personal computer with the ability to display color graphics, and BASIC programming language built in. Inspired by "the technique Atari used to simulate colors on its first arcade games", Wozniak found a way of putting colors into the NTSC system by using a US$1 chip, while colors in the PAL system are achieved by "accident" when a dot occurs on a line, and he says that to this day he has no idea how it works. During the design stage, Jobs argued that the Apple II should have two expansion slots, while Wozniak wanted eight. After a heated argument, during which Wozniak threatened that Jobs should "go get himself another computer", they decided to go with eight slots. Jobs and Wozniak introduced the Apple II at the April 1977 West Coast Computer Faire. Wozniak's first article about the Apple II was in Byte magazine in May 1977. It became one of the first highly successful mass-produced personal computers in the world. Wozniak also designed the Disk II floppy disk drive, released in 1978 specifically for use with the Apple II to replace the slower cassette tape storage.

In 1980, Apple went public to instant and significant financial profitability, making Jobs and Wozniak both millionaires. The Apple II's intended successor, the Apple III, released the same year, was a commercial failure and was discontinued in 1984. According to Wozniak, the Apple III "had 100 percent hardware failures", and that the primary reason for these failures was that the system was designed by Apple's marketing department, unlike Apple's previous engineering-driven projects.

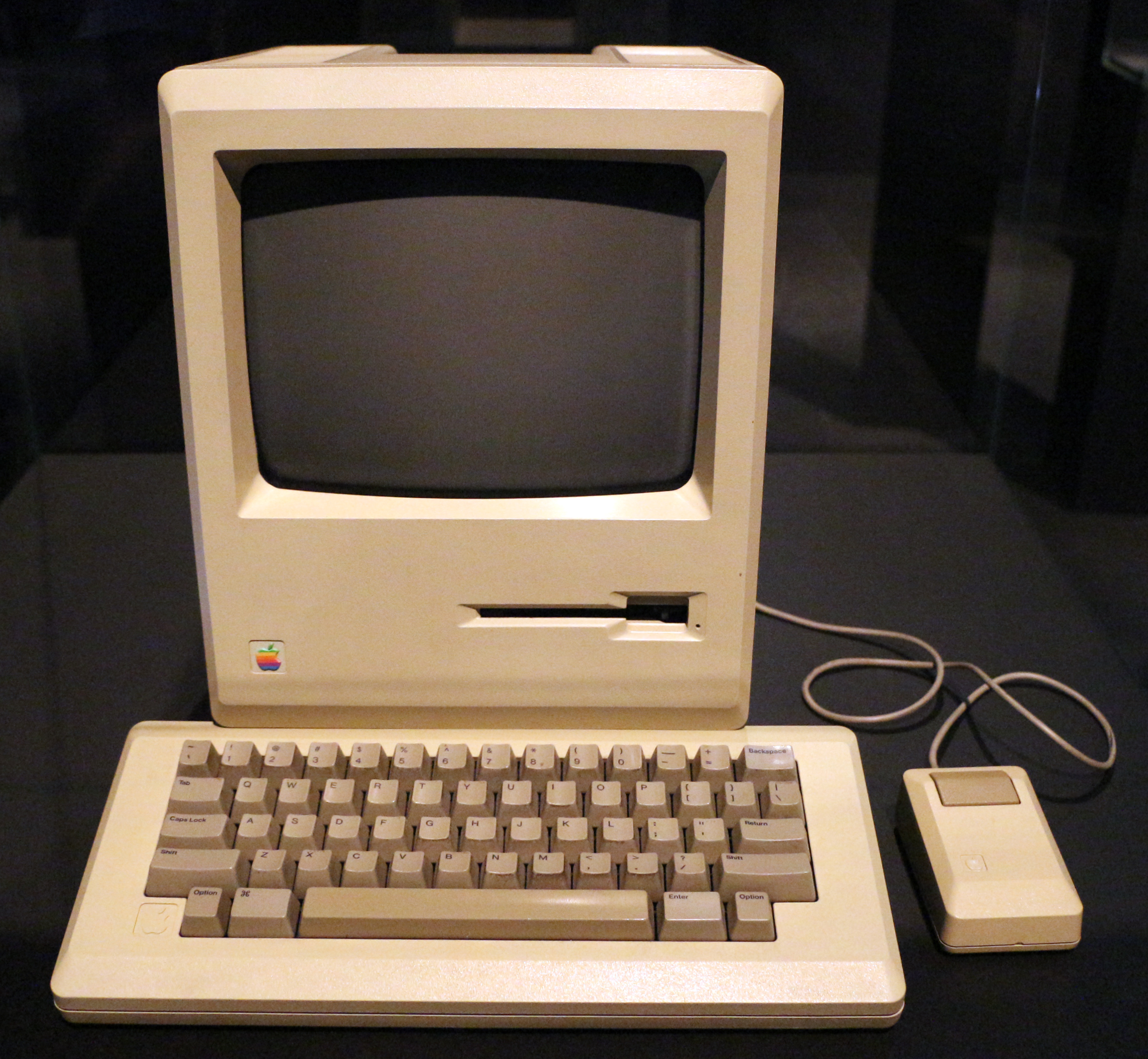
An original Macintosh with peripherals

During the early design and development phase of the original Macintosh, Wozniak had a heavy influence over the project along with Jef Raskin, who conceived the computer. Later named the "Macintosh 128k", it would become the first mass-market personal computer featuring an integral graphical user interface and mouse. The Macintosh would also go on to introduce the desktop publishing industry with the addition of the Apple LaserWriter, the first laser printer to feature vector graphics. In a 2013 interview, Wozniak said that in 1981, "Steve [Jobs] really took over the project when I had a plane crash and wasn't there."

=== Plane crash and temporary leave from Apple ===
On February 7, 1981, the Beechcraft Bonanza A36TC which Wozniak was piloting (and not qualified to operate) crashed soon after takeoff from the Sky Park Airport in Scotts Valley, California. The airplane stalled while climbing, then bounced down the runway, broke through two fences, and crashed into an embankment. Wozniak and his three passengers—then-fiancée Candice Clark, her brother Jack Clark, and Jack's girlfriend, Janet Valleau—were injured. Wozniak sustained severe face and head injuries, including losing a tooth, and also suffered for the following five weeks from anterograde amnesia, the inability to create new memories. He had no memory of the crash, and did not remember his name while in the hospital or the things he did for a time after he was released. He would later state that Apple II computer games were what helped him regain his memory. The National Transportation Safety Board investigation report cited premature liftoff and pilot inexperience as probable causes of the crash.

Wozniak did not immediately return to Apple after recovering from the airplane crash, seeing it as a good reason to leave. Infinite Loop characterized this time: "Coming out of the semi-coma had been like flipping a reset switch in Woz's brain. It was as if in his thirty-year old body he had regained the mind he'd had at eighteen before all the computer madness had begun. And when that happened, Woz found he had little interest in engineering or design. Rather, in an odd sort of way, he wanted to start over fresh."

=== UC Berkeley and US Festivals ===
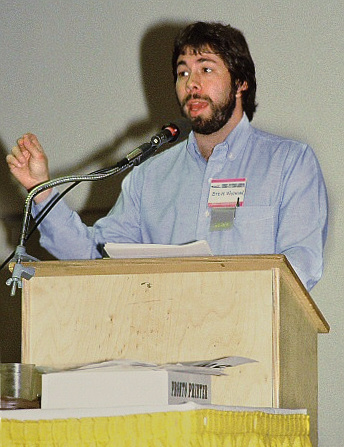
Wozniak in 1983

Later in 1981, after recovering from the plane crash, Wozniak re-enrolled at UC Berkeley to complete his Electrical Engineering and Computer Sciences degree that he started there in 1971 (and which he would finish in 1986). Because his name was well known at this point, he enrolled under the name Rocky Raccoon Clark, which is the name listed on his diploma, although he did not officially receive his degree in electrical engineering and computer sciences until 1987.

In May 1982 and 1983, Wozniak, with help from professional concert promoter Bill Graham, founded the company Unuson, an abbreviation of "unite us in song", which sponsored two US Festivals, with "US" pronounced like the pronoun, not as initials. Initially intended to celebrate evolving technologies, the festivals ended up as a technology exposition and a rock festival as a combination of music, computers, television, and people. After losing several million dollars on the 1982 festival, Wozniak stated that unless the 1983 event turned a profit, he would end his involvement with rock festivals and get back to designing computers. Later that year, Wozniak returned to Apple product development, desiring no more of a role than that of an engineer and a motivational factor for the Apple workforce.

=== Return to Apple product development ===
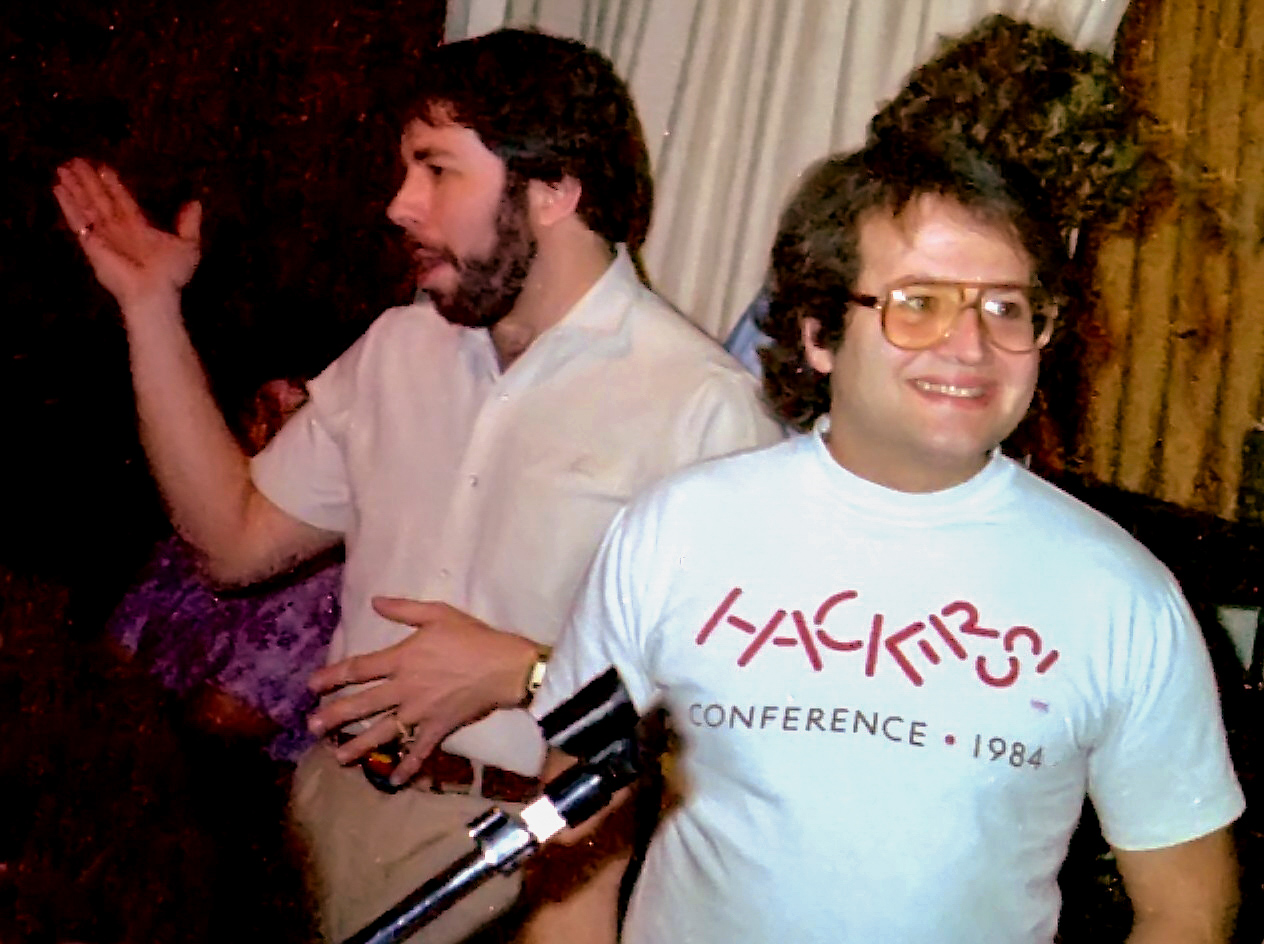
Wozniak and Macintosh system software designer Andy Hertzfeld at an Apple User Group Connection meeting in 1985

Starting in the mid-1980s, as the Macintosh experienced slow but steady growth, Apple's corporate leadership, including Steve Jobs, increasingly disrespected its flagship cash cow Apple II series—and Wozniak along with it. The Apple II division—other than Wozniak—was not invited to the Macintosh introduction event, and Wozniak was seen kicking the dirt in the parking lot. Although Apple II products provided about 85% of Apple's sales in early 1985, the company's January 1985 annual meeting did not mention the Apple II division or its employees, a typical situation that frustrated Wozniak.

=== Final departure from Apple workforce ===
Even with the success he had helped to create at Apple, Wozniak believed that the company was hindering him from being who he wanted to be, and that it was "the bane of his existence". He enjoyed engineering, not management, and said that he missed "the fun of the early days". As other talented engineers joined the growing company, he no longer believed he was needed there. By early 1985, Wozniak left Apple again and sold most of his stock. Media coverage attributed his departure to disagreements with Apple management, quoting his statement that Apple had "been going in the wrong direction for the last five years", but Wozniak later objected to this portrayal and stated that he left primarily because he was excited to start CL 9 and recapture the fun of developing a new technology.

The Apple II platform financially carried the company well into the Macintosh era of the late 1980s; it was made semi-portable with the Apple IIc of 1984, and was extended, with some input from Wozniak, by the 16-bit Apple IIGS of 1986, and was discontinued altogether when the Apple IIe was discontinued on November 15, 1993 (although the Apple IIe card, which allowed compatible Macintosh computers to run Apple II software and use certain Apple II peripherals, was produced until May 1995).

=== Post-Apple ===
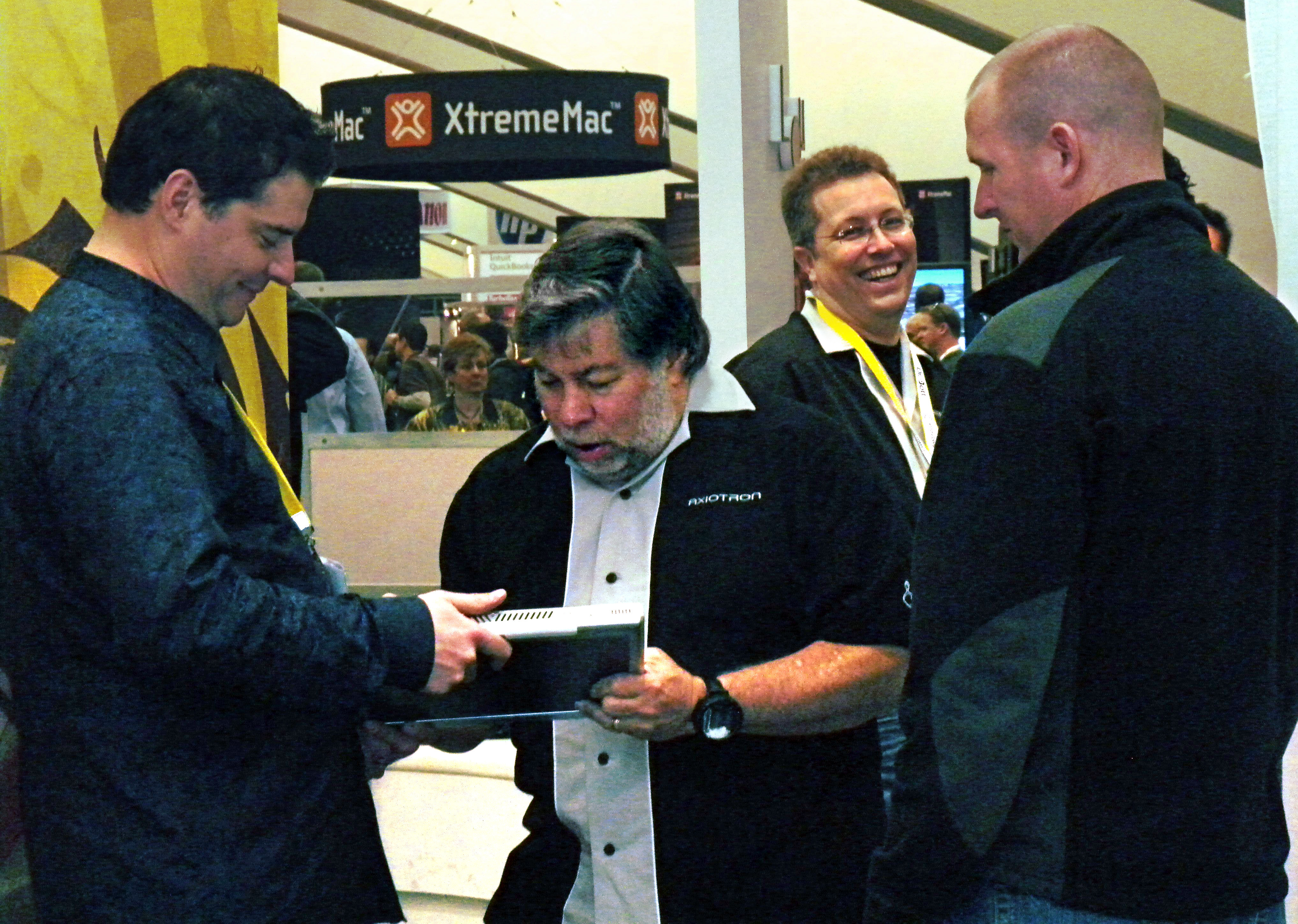
Wozniak signs a Modbook at Macworld Expo in 2009.

After his career at Apple, Wozniak founded CL 9 in 1985, which developed and brought the first programmable universal remote control to market in 1987, called the "CORE". Beyond engineering, Wozniak's second lifelong goal had always been to teach elementary school because of the important role teachers play in students' lives. Eventually, he did teach computer classes to children from the fifth through ninth grades, and teachers as well. Unuson continued to support this, funding additional teachers and equipment.

In 2001, Wozniak founded Wheels of Zeus (WOZ) to create wireless GPS technology to "help everyday people find everyday things much more easily". In 2002, he joined the board of directors of Ripcord Networks, Inc., joining Apple alumni Ellen Hancock, Gil Amelio, Mike Connor, and Wheels of Zeus co-founder Alex Fielding in a new telecommunications venture. Later the same year he joined the board of directors of Danger, Inc., the maker of the Hip Top.

In 2006, Wheels of Zeus was closed, and Wozniak founded Acquicor Technology, a holding company for acquiring technology companies and developing them, with Apple alumni Hancock and Amelio. From 2009 through 2014 he was chief scientist at Fusion-io. In 2014 he became chief scientist at Primary Data, which was founded by some former Fusion-io executives. Silicon Valley Comic Con (SVCC) is an annual pop culture and technology convention at the San Jose McEnery Convention Center in San Jose, California. The convention was co-founded by Wozniak and Rick White, with Trip Hunter as CEO. Wozniak announced the annual event in 2015 along with Marvel legend Stan Lee. In October 2017, Wozniak founded Woz U, an online educational technology service for independent students and employees. As of December 2018, Woz U was licensed as a school with the Arizona state board.

Though permanently leaving Apple as an active employee in 1985, Wozniak chose to never remove himself from the official employee list, and continues to represent the company at events or in interviews. Today he receives a stipend from Apple for this role, estimated in 2006 to be US$120,000 per year. He is also an Apple shareholder. He maintained a friendly acquaintance with Steve Jobs until Jobs's death in October 2011. However, in 2006, Wozniak stated that he and Jobs were not as close as they used to be.

In a 2013 interview, Wozniak said that the original Macintosh "failed" under Steve Jobs, and that it was not until Jobs left that it became a success. He called the Apple Lisa group the team that had kicked Jobs out, and that Jobs liked to call the Lisa group "idiots for making [the Lisa computer] too expensive". To compete with the Lisa, Jobs and his new team produced a cheaper computer, one that, according to Wozniak, was "weak", "lousy" and "still at a fairly high price". "He made it by cutting the RAM down, by forcing you to swap disks here and there", says Wozniak. He attributed the eventual success of the Macintosh to people like John Sculley "who worked to build a Macintosh market when the Apple II went away".

At the end of 2020, Wozniak announced the launch of a new company helmed by him, Efforce. Efforce is described as a marketplace for funding ecologically friendly projects. It used a WOZX cryptocurrency token for funding and blockchain to redistribute the profit to token holders and businesses engaged on the platform. In September 2021, it was reported that Wozniak was also starting a company alongside co-founder Alex Fielding named Privateer Space to address the problem of space debris. Privateer Space debuted the first version of its space traffic monitoring software on March 1, 2022. In 2024, Wozniak sued YouTube in respect to a scam that was being circulated on the platform using his likeness. Later, he won after a San Jose appeals court ruled YouTube was liable for failing to combat it.

== Inventions ==
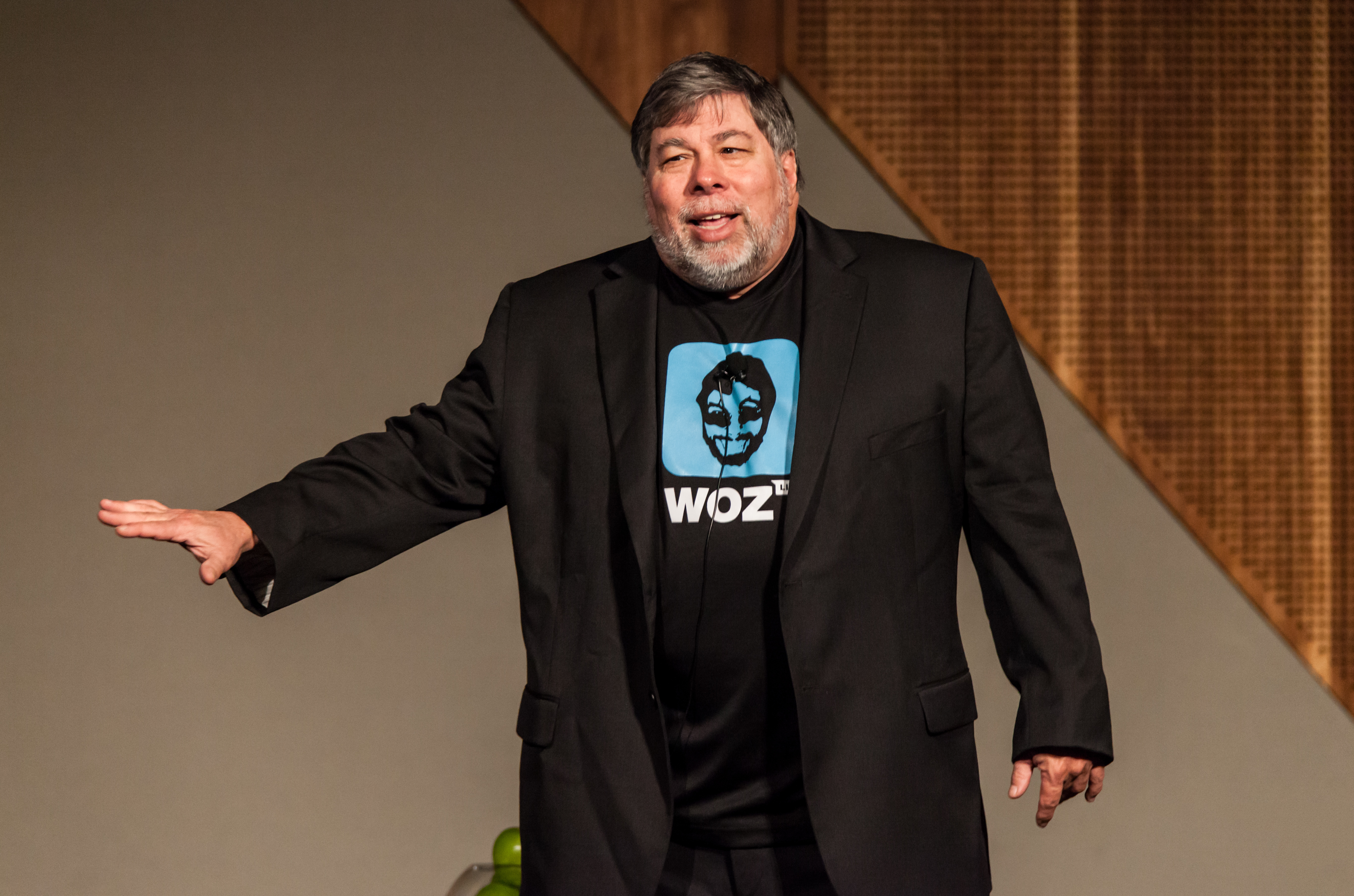
Wozniak at Melbourne Convention and Exhibition Centre, Australia, 2012

Wozniak is listed as the sole inventor on the following Apple patents:

- US Patent No. 4,136,359: "Microcomputer for use with video display"—for which he was inducted into the National Inventors Hall of Fame.
- US Patent No. 4,210,959: "Controller for magnetic disc, recorder, or the like"
- US Patent No. 4,217,604: "Apparatus for digitally controlling PAL color display"
- US Patent No. 4,278,972: "Digitally-controlled color signal generation means for use with display"

== Other ==
In 1990, Wozniak helped found the Electronic Frontier Foundation, providing some of the organization's initial funding and serving on its founding Board of Directors. He is the founding sponsor of the Tech Museum, Silicon Valley Ballet and Children's Discovery Museum of San Jose.

== Views on artificial intelligence ==
In March 2015, Wozniak stated that he had originally dismissed Ray Kurzweil's opinion that machine intelligence would outpace human intelligence. But over time, Wozniak had changed his mind:

I agree that the future is scary and very bad for people. If we build these devices to take care of everything for us, eventually they'll think faster than us and they'll get rid of the slow humans to run companies more efficiently.

Wozniak stated that he had started to identify a contradictory sense of foreboding about artificial intelligence, while still supporting the advance of technology. By June 2015, Wozniak changed his mind again, stating that a superintelligence takeover would be good for humans:

They're going to be smarter than us and if they're smarter than us then they'll realise they need us ... We want to be the family pet and be taken care of all the time ... I got this idea a few years ago and so I started feeding my dog filet steak and chicken every night because 'do unto others'.

In 2016, Wozniak changed his mind again, stating that he no longer worried about the possibility of superintelligence emerging because he is skeptical that computers will be able to compete with human "intuition": "A computer could figure out a logical endpoint decision, but that's not the way intelligence works in humans". Wozniak added that if computers do become superintelligent, "they're going to be partners of humans over all other species just forever".

Wozniak signed a 2023 open letter from the Future of Life Institute calling for "all AI labs to immediately pause for at least 6 months the training of AI systems more powerful than GPT-4". In an interview to the BBC in May 2023 Wozniak said that AI may make scams more difficult to detect, noting that "AI is so intelligent it's open to the bad players, the ones that want to trick you about who they are".

== Personal life ==
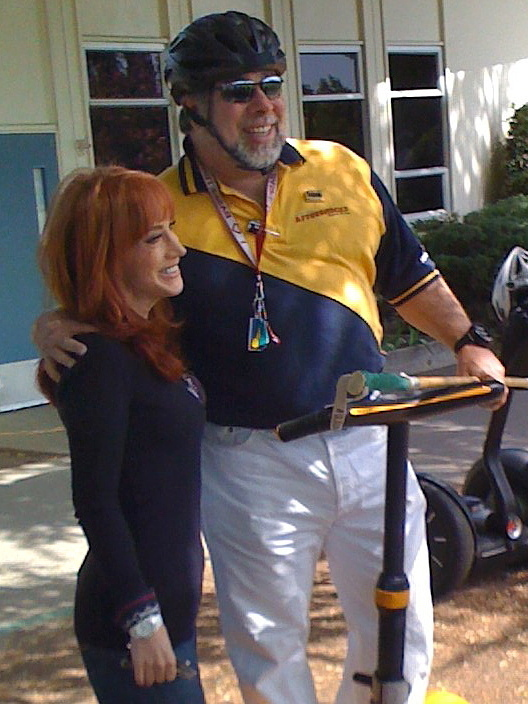
Wozniak and friend Kathy Griffin in 2008

Wozniak lives in Los Gatos, California. He applied for Australian citizenship in 2012, and has stated that he would like to live in Melbourne, Australia, in the future. Wozniak has been referred to frequently by the nickname "Woz", or "The Woz"; he has also been called "The Wonderful Wizard of Woz" and "The Second Steve" (in regard to his early business partner and longtime friend, Steve Jobs). "WoZ" (short for "Wheels of Zeus") is the name of a company he founded in 2002; it closed in 2006.

Wozniak describes his impetus for joining the Freemasons in 1979 as being able to spend more time with his then-wife, Alice Robertson, who belonged to the Order of the Eastern Star, associated with the Masons. He was initiated in 1979 at Charity Lodge No. 362 in Campbell, California, now part of Mt. Moriah Lodge No. 292 in Los Gatos. Today he is no longer involved: "I did become a Freemason and know what it's about but it doesn't really fit my tech/geek personality. Still, I can be polite to others from other walks of life. After our divorce was filed I never attended again but I did contribute enough for a lifetime membership."

Wozniak was married to slalom canoe gold-medalist Candice Clark from June 1981 to 1987. They have three children together, the youngest being born after their divorce was finalized. After a high-profile relationship with actress Kathy Griffin, who described him on Tom Green's House Tonight in 2008 as "the biggest techno-nerd in the Universe", Wozniak married Janet Hill, his current spouse. On his religious views, Wozniak has called himself an "atheist or agnostic".

He is a member of a Segway Polo team, the Silicon Valley Aftershocks, and is considered a "super fan" of the NHL ice hockey team San Jose Sharks. In 1998, he co-authored with Larry Wilde The Official Computer Freaks Joke Book. In 2006, he co-authored with Gina Smith his autobiography, iWoz: From Computer Geek to Cult Icon: How I Invented the Personal Computer, Co-Founded Apple, and Had Fun Doing It. The book made The New York Times Best Seller list.

Wozniak has discussed his personal disdain for money and accumulating large amounts of wealth. He told Fortune magazine in 2017, "I didn't want to be near money, because it could corrupt your values ... I really didn't want to be in that super 'more than you could ever need' category." He also said that he only invests in things "close to his heart". When Apple first went public in 1980, Wozniak offered $10 million of his own stock to early Apple employees, something Jobs refused to do. In 2017, Wozniak received Polish citizenship and visited Poland to meet with government and technology industry representatives and to visit his father's [ancestral] hometown.

He has the condition prosopagnosia (face blindness). Wozniak has expressed support for the right to repair movement. In July 2021, he made a Cameo video in response to right to repair activist Louis Rossmann, in which he described the issue as something that has "really affected me emotionally", and credited Apple's early breakthroughs to open technology of the 1970s. In November 2023, Wozniak suffered a minor stroke while preparing to speak at a conference in Mexico City. He was hospitalized briefly before returning home.

In early December 2023, Steve Wozniak spoke at a conference in Belgrade, Serbia, where he was granted Serbian citizenship through a "Citizenship by Exception" program. This form of discretionary naturalization is granted by the Serbian government to individuals who could make contribution to the advancement of Serbia's national interests. The decision received significant coverage in Serbian state media. It was criticized by the Serbian political opposition, who accused the government, the President and his ruling Party, of using the event as political promotion ahead of the 2023 Serbian parliamentary election. The government denied these allegations. Wozniak stated that he had been invited by Janko Tipsarević, a former Serbian tennis player who had earlier that year become affiliated with the ruling party. During his visit, Wozniak expressed strong support for Serbia, stating: "I’m a Serb who lives in America and that’s how I want to be," and "I want to help promote Serbia and Serbian interests for the rest of my life." He also said he will promote events in Serbia like EXPO 2027, an upcoming international exhibition to be hosted in Belgrade-Serbia, and that he would promote Serbia while residing in the US.

== Honors and awards ==
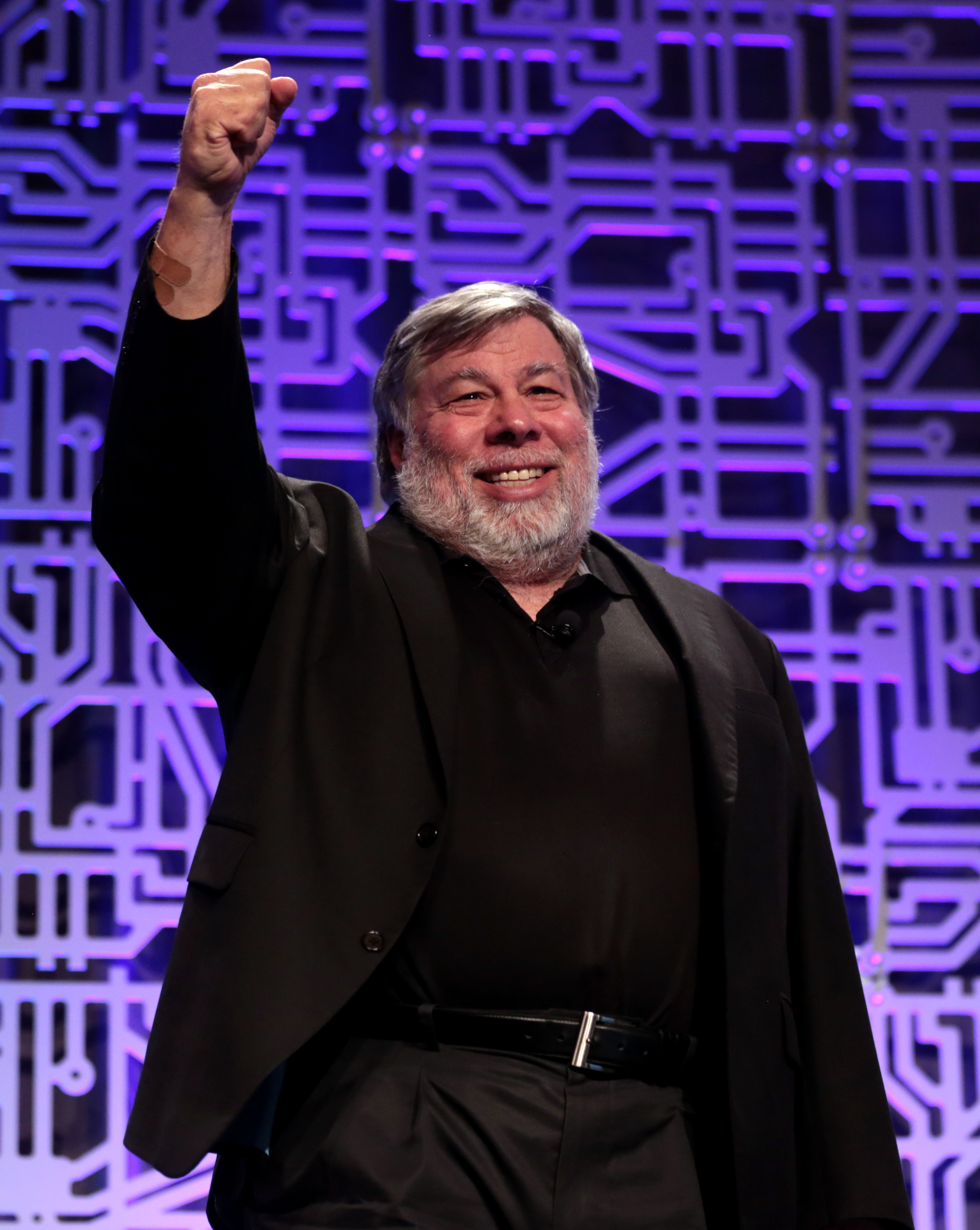
Wozniak speaking at a conference in Paradise Valley, Arizona in 2017

Because of his lifetime of achievements, multiple organizations have given Wozniak awards and recognition, including:

- In 1979, Wozniak was awarded the ACM Grace Murray Hopper Award.
- In 1985, both he and Steve Jobs received the National Medal of Technology from US President Ronald Reagan, the country's highest honor for achievements related to technological progress.
- Later he donated funds to create the "Woz Lab" at the University of Colorado at Boulder. In 1998, he was named a Fellow of the Computer History Museum "for co-founding Apple Computer and inventing the Apple I personal computer."
- In 2000, Wozniak received the American Computer & Robotics Museum's George R. Stibitz Computing and Communications Innovator Award "for inventing the Apple I & Apple II computers & for co-founding of the Apple Computer Company." In 2022, Wozniak received the museum's Lifetime Achievement award for his role in the invention of the Apple I & II computers and the co-founding Apple. He has also personally signed and donated an Apple I to the museum, and is listed as one of the museum's "founders" level donors for this donation.
- In September 2000, Wozniak was inducted into the National Inventors Hall of Fame, and in 2001 he was awarded the 7th Annual Heinz Award for Technology, the Economy and Employment.
- The American Humanist Association awarded him the Isaac Asimov Science Award in 2011.
- In 2004, Wozniak was given the 5th Annual Telluride Tech Festival Award of Technology.
- He was awarded the Global Award of the President of Armenia for Outstanding Contribution to Humanity Through IT in 2011.
- On February 17, 2014, in Los Angeles, Wozniak was awarded the 66th Hoover Medal from IEEE President & CEO J. Roberto de Marca. The award is presented to an engineer whose professional achievements and personal endeavors have advanced the well-being of humankind and is administered by a board representing five engineering organizations: The American Society of Mechanical Engineers; the American Society of Civil Engineers; the American Institute of Chemical Engineers; the American Institute of Mining, Metallurgical, and Petroleum Engineers; and Institute of Electrical and Electronics Engineers.
- The New York City Chapter of Young Presidents' Organization presented their 2014 Lifetime Achievement Award to Wozniak on October 16, 2014, at the American Museum of Natural History.
- In November 2014, Industry Week added Wozniak to the Manufacturing Hall of Fame.
- On June 19, 2015, Wozniak received the Legacy for Children Award from the Children's Discovery Museum of San Jose. The Legacy for Children Award honors an individual whose legacy has significantly benefited the learning and lives of children. The purpose of the Award is to focus Silicon Valley's attention on the needs of our children, encouraging us all to take responsibility for their well-being. Candidates are nominated by a committee of notable community members involved in children's education, health care, human and social services, and the arts. The city of San Jose named a street "Woz Way" in his honor. The street address of the Children's Discovery Museum of San Jose is 180 Woz Way.
- On June 20, 2015, The Cal Alumni Association (UC Berkeley's Alumni Association) presented Wozniak with the 2015 Alumnus of the Year Award. "We are honored to recognize Steve Wozniak with CAA's most esteemed award", said CAA President Cynthia So Schroeder '91. "His invaluable contributions to education and to UC Berkeley place him among Cal's most accomplished and respected alumni."
- In March 2016, High Point University announced that Wozniak will serve as their Innovator in Residence. Wozniak was High Point University's commencement speaker in 2013. Through this ongoing partnership, Wozniak will connect with High Point University students on a variety of topics and make campus-visits periodically.

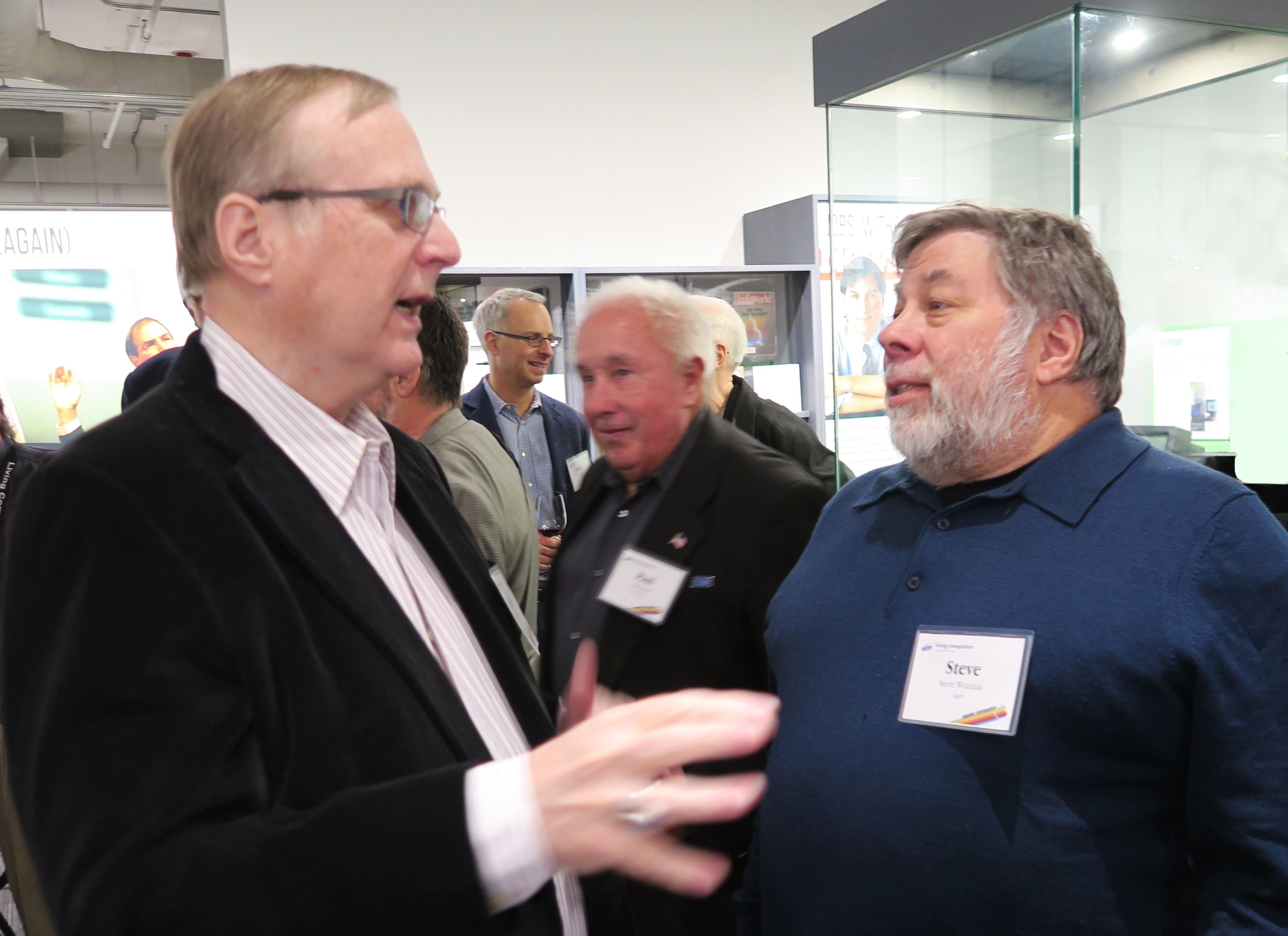
Microsoft co-founder Paul Allen and Wozniak at the Living Computer Museum in 2017

- In March 2017, Wozniak was listed by UK-based company Richtopia at number 18 on its list of the 200 Most Influential Philanthropists and Social Entrepreneurs.
- Wozniak is the 2021 recipient of the IEEE Masaru Ibuka Consumer Electronics Award "for pioneering the design of consumer-friendly personal computers."
- In 2026, Wozniak received the 2025 James C. Morgan Global Humanitarian Award from The Tech Interactive at its Tech for Global Good Celebration in San Jose.

=== Honorary degrees ===
For his contributions to technology, Wozniak has been awarded a number of Honorary Doctoral degrees, which include the following:

- University of Colorado Boulder: 1989
- North Carolina State University: 2004
- Kettering University: 2005
- Nova Southeastern University, Fort Lauderdale: 2005
- ESPOL University in Ecuador: 2008
- Michigan State University, in East Lansing 2011
- Concordia University in Montreal, Canada: June 22, 2011
- State Engineering University of Armenia: November 11, 2011
- Santa Clara University: June 16, 2012
- University Camilo José Cela in Madrid, Spain: November 8, 2013
- Lincoln Law School in San Jose, California: May 19, 2023
- Technical University of Moldova (UTM) in Chișinău, Moldova: October 19, 2025
- Grand Valley State University, Honorary Doctor of Computer Science, May 1, 2026

== In media ==
Wozniak has been mentioned, represented, and interviewed numerous times in media from the founding of Apple to the present.

=== Documentaries ===
- Steve Jobs: The Man in the Machine (2015)
- Camp Woz: The Admirable Lunacy of Philanthropy – a 2009 documentary
- Geeks On Board – a 2007 documentary
- The Secret History of Hacking – a 2001 documentary film featuring Wozniak and other phreakers and computer hackers.
- Triumph of the Nerds – a 1996 PBS documentary series about the rise of the personal computer.
- Steve Wozniak's Formative Moment – a March 15, 2016, original short feature film from Reddit Formative Moment

=== Feature films ===
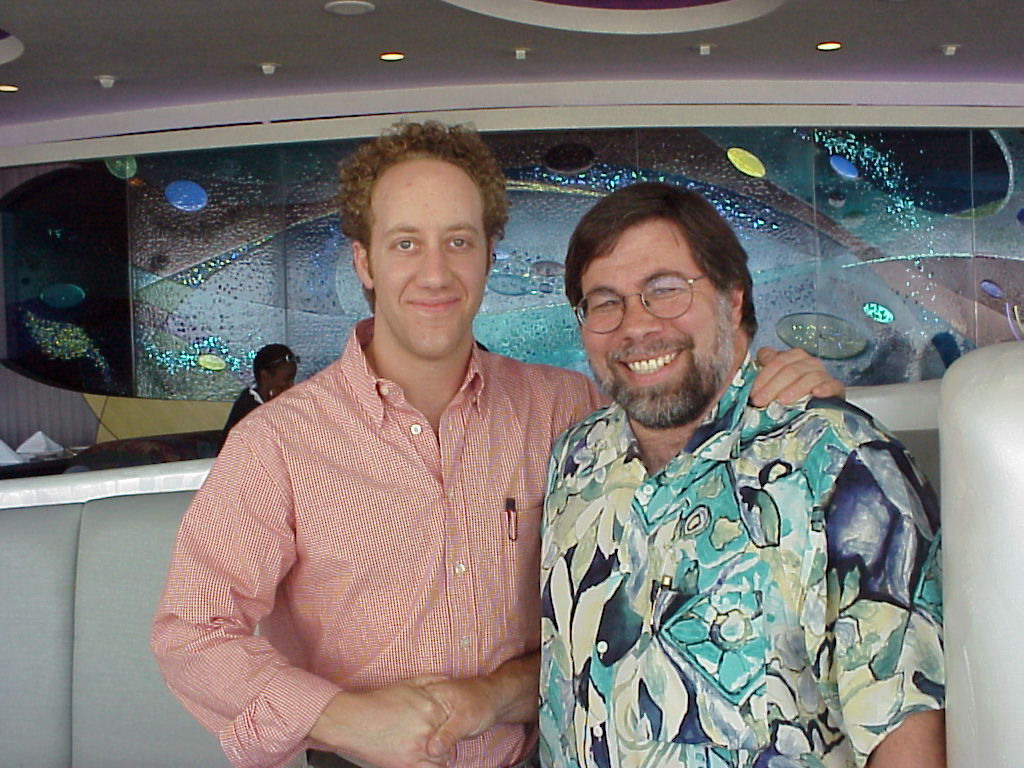
Wozniak and Joey Slotnick (left), who portrayed him in the 1999 film Pirates of Silicon Valley

- 1999: Pirates of Silicon Valley – a TNT film directed by Martyn Burke. Wozniak is portrayed by Joey Slotnick while Jobs is played by Noah Wyle.
- 2013: Jobs – a film directed by Joshua Michael Stern. Wozniak is portrayed by Josh Gad, while Jobs is portrayed by Ashton Kutcher.
- 2015: Steve Jobs – a feature film by Danny Boyle, with a screenplay written by Aaron Sorkin. Wozniak is portrayed by Seth Rogen, while Jobs is portrayed by Michael Fassbender.
- 2015: Steve Jobs vs. Bill Gates: The Competition to Control the Personal Computer, 1974–1999: Original film from the National Geographic Channel for the American Genius series.

=== Television ===
- TechTV – The Screen Savers 2002-09-27 (Steve Wozniak and Kevin Mitnick a convicted hacker) Featuring an interview with Adrian Lamo
- After seeing her stand-up performance in Saratoga, California, Wozniak began dating comedian Kathy Griffin. Together, they attended the 2007 Emmy Awards, and subsequently made many appearances on the fourth season of her show Kathy Griffin: My Life on the D-List. Wozniak is on the show as her date for the Producers Guild of America award show. However, on a June 19, 2008, appearance on The Howard Stern Show, Griffin confirmed that they were no longer dating and decided to remain friends.
- Wozniak portrays a parody of himself in the first episode of the television series Code Monkeys; he plays the owner of Gameavision before selling it to help fund his next enterprise. He later appears again in the 12th episode when he is in Las Vegas at the annual Video Game Convention and sees Dave and Jerry. He also appears in a parody of the "Get a Mac" ads featured in the final episode of Code Monkeys second season.
- Wozniak is interviewed and featured in the documentary Hackers Wanted.
- Wozniak competed on Season 8 of Dancing with the Stars in 2009 where he danced with Karina Smirnoff. Though Wozniak and Smirnoff received 10 combined points from the three judges out of 30, the lowest score of the evening, he remained in the competition. He later posted on a social networking site that he believed that the vote count was not legitimate and suggested that the Dancing with the Stars judges had lied about the vote count to keep him on the show. After being briefed on the method of judging and vote counting, he retracted and apologized for his statements. Though suffering a pulled hamstring and a fracture in his foot, Wozniak continued to compete, but was eliminated from the competition on March 31, with a score of 12 out of 30 for an Argentine Tango.
- On September 30, 2010, he appeared as himself on The Big Bang Theory season 4 episode "The Cruciferous Vegetable Amplification". While dining in The Cheesecake Factory where Penny works, he is approached by Sheldon via telepresence on a Texai robot. Leonard tries to explain to Penny who Wozniak is, but she says she already knows him from Dancing with the Stars.
- On September 30, 2013, he appeared along with early Apple employees Daniel Kottke and Andy Hertzfeld on the television show John Wants Answers to discuss the movie Jobs.
- In April 2021, Wozniak became a panelist for the TV series Unicorn Hunters, a business investment show from the makers of the series The Masked Singer.

== See also ==
- Apple IIGS (limited edition case molded with Woz's signature)
- Group coded recording (encoding methods for representing data)
- Hackers: Heroes of the Computer Revolution (1984 book)
- Information Age (which Wozniak and Jobs helped pioneer)
- Woz Challenge Cup (Segway polo world championship)
