= Wheels of Zeus =

Defunct American GPS tag manufacturer

- Type: GPS locator tag
- Released: Never released
- Discontinued: March 2006
- Operating system: n/a
- CPU: n/a
- Memory: n/a
- Made in: United States

Wheels of Zeus (styled as WoZ) was a company founded in 2002 by Apple co-founder Steve Wozniak. WoZ made wireless hardware for keeping track of the physical location of enabled objects.

In 2004, Motorola announced that it has licensed Wheel of Zeus' WOZ Platform "to develop new networked consumer-electronics devices".

The licensable technology consisted of three components:

1. Smart Tag A tag containing GPS that could be attached to various objects, such as a briefcase or pet. "Acceptable areas" could be preprogrammed, such that the tag would signal the Tag Detector when it was moved outside them. The tag communicated over a wireless network named "wOzNet" and used GPS techniques to transmit the tag's position over extreme distances with very little power.
2. Tag Detector This was a handheld device that could monitor a collection of Smart Tags, and provide a distance and direction to help locate them when they were lost. It also communicated with the wOz Service when a Smart Tag was lost.
3. WoZ Service An internet-based service that could provide the locations of the various Smart Tags, as well as send an email or SMS notification when a Smart Tag moved outside of its "acceptable area".

In March 2006, Wheels of Zeus shut down operations. Some assets and patents were acquired by ZonTrak.
