= Universal Electronics =

American smart home technology provider

Universal Electronics Inc
- Type: Public
- Traded as: Nasdaq: UEIC
- Industry: Consumer electronics
- Founded: 1986; 40 years ago
- Headquarters: Scottsdale, Arizona, U.S.
- Products: IoT devices, smart thermostat, smart home, virtual assistant, remote controls
- Brands: QuickSet; QuickSet Cloud; One For All; Nevo; Ecolink; RCS
- Website: uei.com

Universal Electronics Inc. (UEI) is an American smart home technology provider and manufacturer of universal remote controls, IoT devices such as voice-enabled smart home hubs, smart thermostats, home sensors; As well as a white label digital assistant platform optimized for smart home applications, and other software and cloud services for device discovery, fingerprinting and interoperability. The company designs, develops, manufactures and ships products both under the "One For All" brand and as an OEM for other companies in the audio video, subscription broadcasting, connected home, tablet and smart phone markets. In 2015, it expanded its product and technology platform to include home automation, intelligent sensing and security.

UEI's global headquarters is located in Scottsdale, Arizona, with R&D offices in Santa Ana, California, regional offices in Enschede (The Netherlands), Manaus (Brazil), Hong Kong, Bangalore (India), San Mateo and Carlsbad (California), and Twinsburg (Ohio).

In 2014 UEI was ranked 80 on Forbes' list of "America's Best Small Companies."

Many of UEI's products use different low power wireless technologies such as Bluetooth and Zigbee (or other 802.15.4 communications). UEI is a member of different wireless industry alliances such as Zigbee Alliance, Bluetooth SIG as well as Wi-Fi Alliance. UEI also offers SoCs such as UE878 and SDK to enable multi-protocol communication for different smart home devices such as leading Smart TVs.

== Products ==
UEI is one of the world's largest manufacturers of remote controls, responsible for an estimated 30% global market share in home entertainment remotes. Under its Ecolink brand, it also makes home security and automation products such as motion and door/window entry sensors for DIY and professional home security markets and OEMs.

UEI makes numerous products that use Zigbee, Bluetooth or Wi-Fi technology. They are a member of the ZigBee Alliance, Bluetooth SIG and Wi-Fi Alliance.

=== QuickSet Cloud ===
QuickSet Cloud is Universal Electronics’ software product family including web services and embedded SDK for simplifying discovery and universal control setup and operation in a smart home.

== Acquisitions ==
In February 2009, UEI purchased all of Zilog's software & IP assets related to Zilog's universal remote control business, including all ROM code, software, and database of infrared codes. Zilog sold these assets for $31 million cash.

In August 2015, UEI acquired Ecolink Intelligent Technology, a wireless home security and automation specialist. In May 2017, UEI further expanded by acquiring RCS Technology, a pioneer in smart thermostats and energy management.

== Honors ==
In 2017, National Academy of Television Arts & Sciences awarded UEI a Technology & Engineering Emmy Award for its contribution to "Contextual Voice Navigation for Discovering and Interacting with TV Content."

== Uyghur Labor ==
In 2021, Reuters reported that UEI had made a deal with officials in the Xinjiang Uygur Autonomous Region to transport some 400 Uyghur workers to one of its plants for alleged forced labor. Reuters then reported that UEI terminated its relationship with a staffing agency that hired the workers. Three U.S. Senators wrote a letter "demanding answers" from UEI following the Reuters report.
