= List of Apple drives =

A list of all Apple internal and external drives in chronological order of introduction.

== Floppy disk drives ==
- Disk II
- Disk III
- Apple "Twiggy" FileWare
- Disk IIc
- 400K Drive (internal)
- Macintosh External Disk Drive (400K)
- UniDisk
- DuoDisk
- UniDisk 3.5
- Macintosh 800K External Drive
- Disk 5.25
- Apple 3.5 Drive
- Apple SuperDrive
- Macintosh HDI-20 External 1.4MB Drive

== Hard disk drives ==
- Apple ProFile
- Apple Widget
- Macintosh Hard Disk 20
- Apple Hard Disk 20SC
- Xserve RAID
- Time Capsule

== Optical drives ==
- AppleCD
- PowerCD
- SuperDrive
- Apple MacBook Air SuperDrive

== Other drives ==
- Apple Tape Backup 40SC
- Fusion Drive
