= Macintosh 512Ke =

Personal computer by Apple, Inc

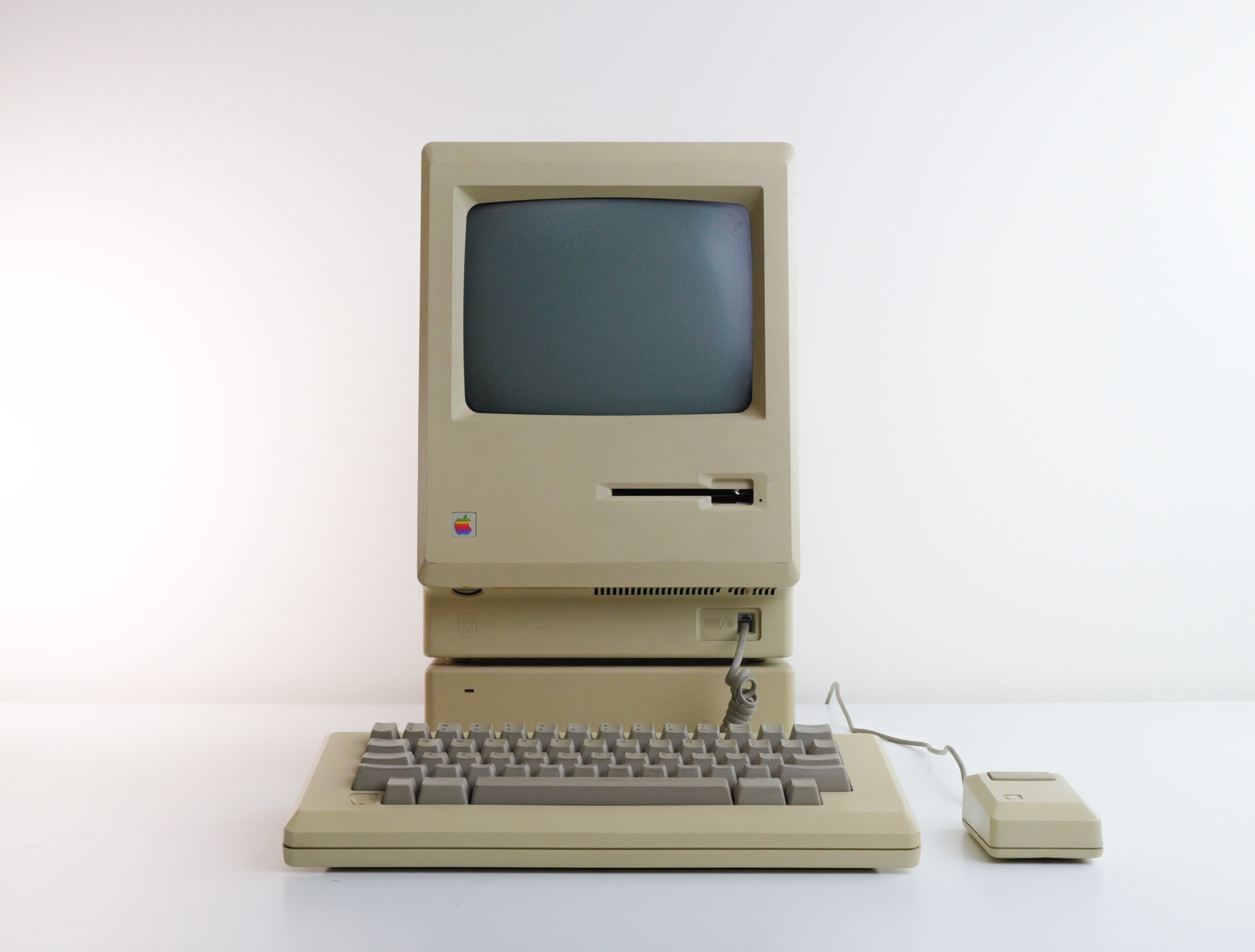
- Macintosh 512Ke sitting atop a Hard Disk 20
- Also known as: M0001E; Macintosh ED (M0001D, M0001ED)
- Manufacturer: Apple Computer, Inc.
- Product family: Compact Macintosh
- Type: All-in-one
- Released: April 14, 1986; 40 years ago
- Introductory price: US$2,000 (equivalent to $5,900 in 2025)
- Discontinued: September 1, 1987
- Operating system: System 3–6.0.8
- CPU: Motorola 68000 @ 7.8336 MHz
- Memory: 512 KB
- Removable storage: 3 1/2-inch 800K floppy disk
- Display: 9-inch (23 cm) monochrome, 512 × 342
- Dimensions: Height: 13.6 in (35 cm); Width: 9.6 in (24 cm); Depth: 10.9 in (28 cm)
- Weight: 16.5 lb (7.5 kg)
- Predecessor: Macintosh 512K
- Successor: Macintosh SE
- Related: Macintosh Plus
- Made in: USA

The Macintosh 512K enhanced (512Ke) was introduced in April 1986 as a cheaper alternative to the top-of-the-line Macintosh Plus, which had debuted three months previously. It is the same as the Macintosh 512K but includes the 800K disk drive and 128K of ROM used in the Macintosh Plus. The new ROM supported HFS used on 800K and larger disks and allowed the Hard Disk 20 to be used as a startup disk, doing away with the Hard Disk 20 Startup floppy required by the prior Macintosh 512K. Like its predecessors, the 512Ke has little room for expansion. Some companies did create memory upgrades to bring the machine up to 2 MB or more.

== Model differences ==
Originally, the case was identical to its predecessor, except for the model number listed on the rear bucket's agency approval label. It used the same beige-like color as well. Later in its lifespan, the 512Ke was discounted and offered to the educational market, badged as the Macintosh ED (M0001D, and later M0001ED).

The 512Ke shipped with the original short Macintosh Keyboard, but the extended Macintosh Plus Keyboard with built-in numeric keypad could be purchased optionally. A version of the 512Ke sold only outside of North America included the full keyboard and was marketed as the Macintosh 512K/800. Later, the larger keyboard would be included as standard in North America as well.

Although the 512Ke includes the same 128K ROMs and 800K disk drive as the Mac Plus, the 512Ke retains the same port connectors as the first two models. For this reason, 512Ke users' only hard disk option is the slower floppy-port-based Hard Disk 20, or similar products for the serial port, even though the 512Ke ROMs contain the SCSI Manager software that enables the use of faster SCSI hard disks (because the ROMs are the same as those used in the Mac Plus, which does have a SCSI port). Apple did point users to certain third-party products which could be added to the 512Ke to provide a SCSI port.

== Official upgrades ==
A Macintosh 512K could be upgraded to a 512Ke by purchasing and installing Apple's $299 Macintosh Plus Disk Drive Kit. This included the following:

- 800 KB double-sided floppy disk drive to replace the original 400 KB single-sided drive
- 128 KB ROM chips to replace original 64 KB ROM
- Macintosh Plus System Tools disk with updated system software
- Installation guide

One further upgrade made by Apple replaced the logic board and the rear case (to accommodate the different port configuration) with those of the Macintosh Plus, providing built-in SCSI functionality and up to 4 MB RAM. Because Apple's official upgrades were costly, many third-party manufacturers offered add-on SCSI cards, as well as RAM upgrades, to achieve the same functionality. The new ROM allowed the computer to run much newer system and application software; though it loaded more data into RAM, it only slightly decreased the amount of available memory – by 1.5 KB – leaving well over 370 KB available for applications.

== System software ==
After June 1986, the 512Ke shipped with System 3.2. After it was discontinued, Apple changed the recommended OS for the 512Ke to System 4.1. System 6.0.8 is the maximum OS for the 512Ke.

== Timeline ==
Timeline of Compact Macintosh models
See also: List of Mac models and Compact Macintosh

== See also ==
- Macintosh 128K/512K technical details
