= Macintosh 512K =

Second model of Apple's Macintosh computer line

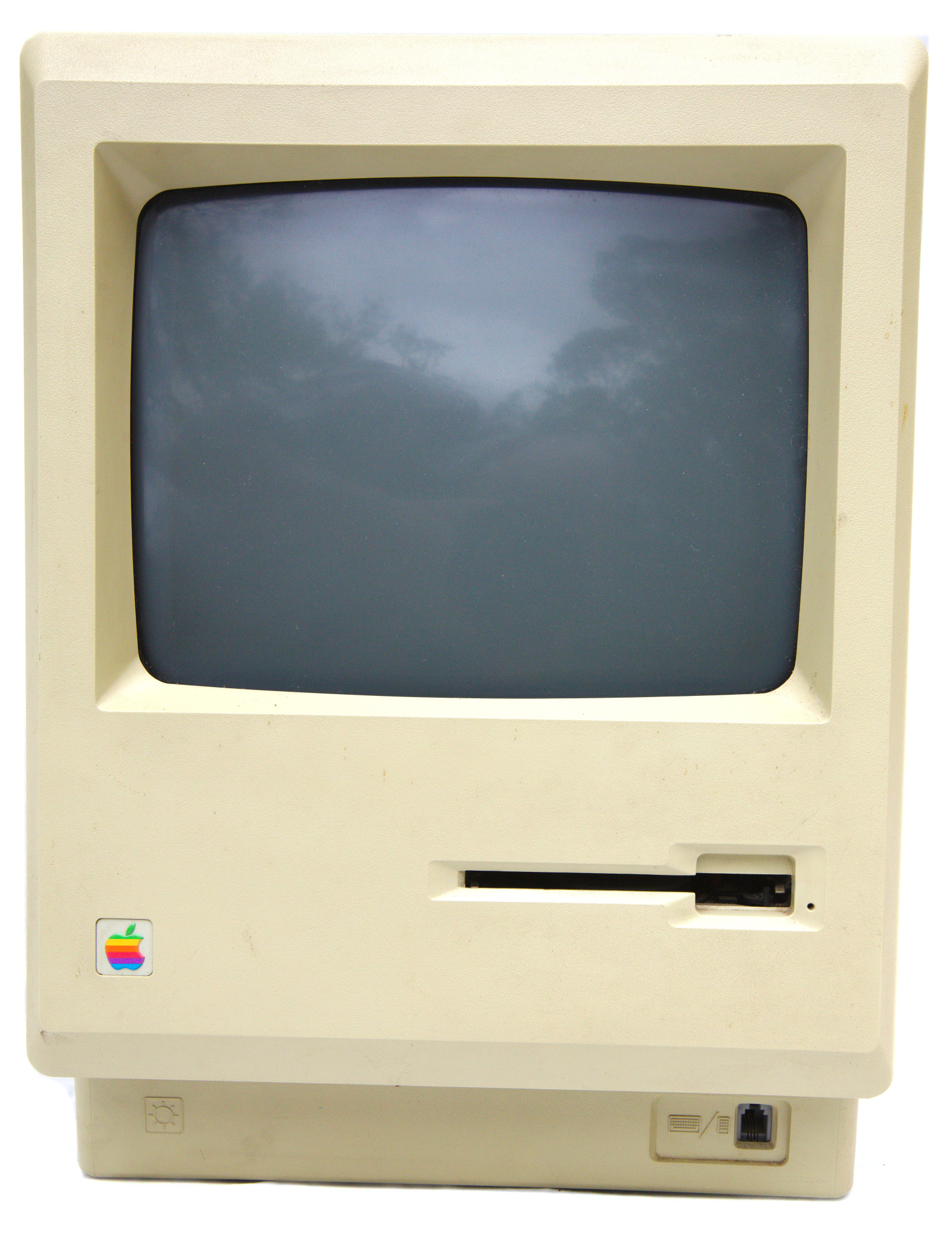
- Also known as: M0001W; Fat Mac
- Manufacturer: Apple Computer
- Product family: Compact Macintosh
- Type: All-in-one
- Released: September 10, 1984; 42 years ago
- Introductory price: US$3,195 (equivalent to $9,900 in 2025)
- Discontinued: April 14, 1986
- Operating system: System 1.1–4.1
- CPU: Motorola 68000 @ 7.8336 MHz
- Memory: 512 KB
- Removable storage: 3 1/2-inch 400K floppy disk
- Display: 9-inch (23 cm) monochrome, 512 × 342
- Dimensions: Height: 13.6 in (35 cm); Width: 9.6 in (24 cm); Depth: 10.9 in (28 cm)
- Weight: 16.5 lb (7.5 kg)
- Predecessor: Macintosh 128K
- Successor: Macintosh 512Ke; Macintosh Plus
- Related: Macintosh XL
- Made in: USA

The Macintosh 512K is a personal computer that was designed, manufactured and sold by Apple Computer from September 1984 to April 1986. It is the first update to the original Macintosh 128K. It was virtually identical to the previous Macintosh, differing primarily in the amount of built-in random-access memory. The increased memory turned the Macintosh into a more business-capable computer and gained the ability to run more software. It is the earliest Macintosh model that can be used as an AppleShare server.

The Macintosh 512K originally shipped with the System 1.1 operating system but was able to run all versions of Mac OS up to System 4.1. It was replaced by the Macintosh 512Ke and the Macintosh Plus. All support for the Macintosh 512K ended on September 1, 1998.

== Features ==
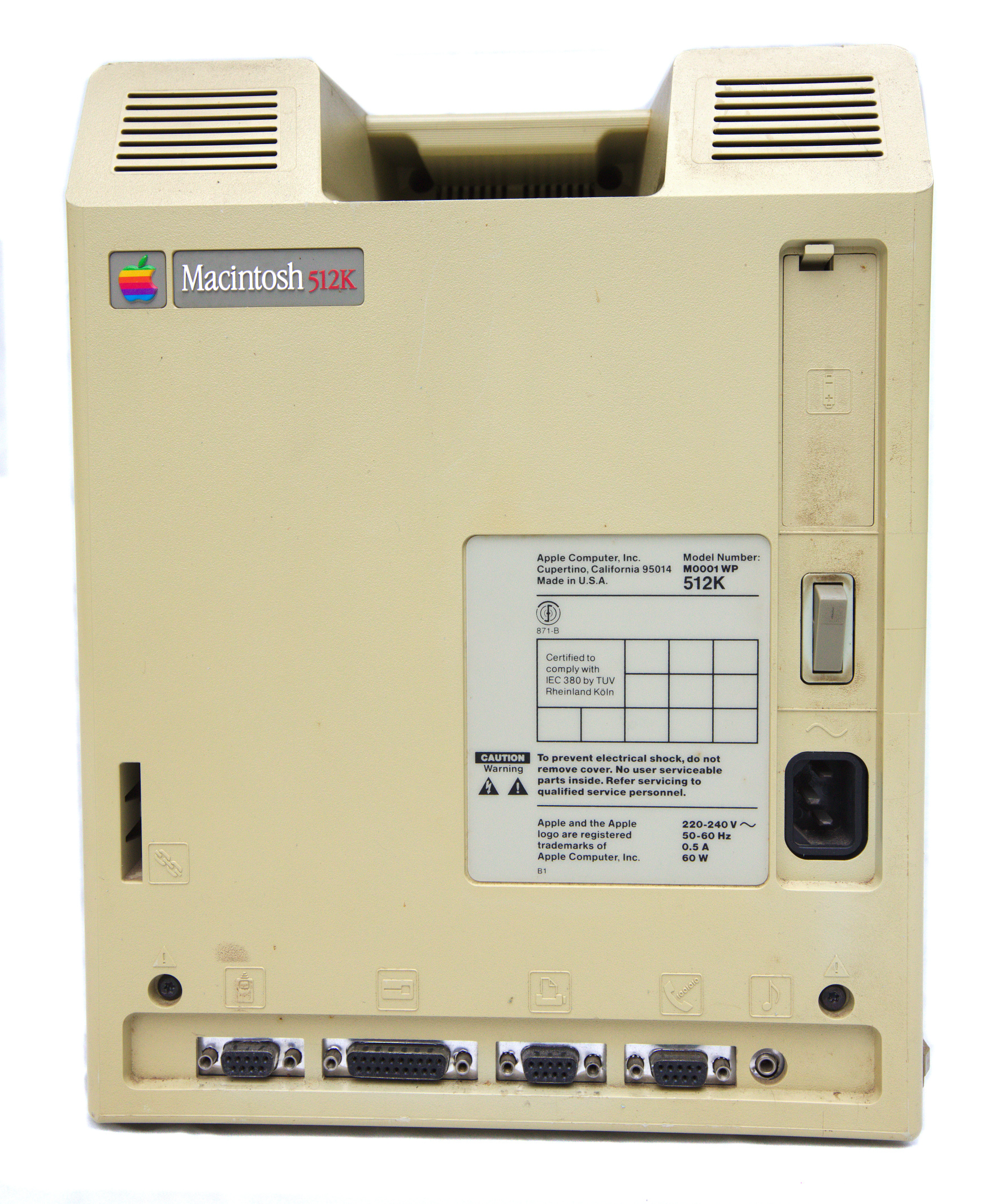
Macintosh 512K back panel

=== Processor and memory ===
Like the Macintosh 128K before it, the 512K contained a Motorola 68000 connected to 512 KB of DRAM by a 16-bit data bus. Though the memory had been quadrupled, it could not be upgraded. The large increase earned it the nickname Fat Mac. A 64 KB ROM chip boosts the effective memory to 576 KB, but this is offset by the display's 22 KB framebuffer, which is shared with the DMA video controller. This shared arrangement reduces CPU performance by up to 35%. It shared a revised logic board with the rebadged Macintosh 128K (previously just called the Macintosh), which streamlined manufacturing. The resolution of the display was the same at 512 × 342.

Apple sold an upgrade for the Macintosh 128K to increase memory to 512 KB for US$995 (equivalent to $3,080 in 2025), which decreased as DRAM prices fell months later.

=== Software ===
The applications MacPaint and MacWrite were still bundled with the Mac. Soon after this model was released, several other applications became available, including MacDraw, MacProject, Macintosh Pascal and others. In particular, Microsoft Excel, which was written specifically for the Macintosh, required a minimum of 512 KB of RAM, but solidified the Macintosh as a serious business computer. Models with the enhanced ROM also supported Apple's Switcher, allowing cooperative multitasking among (necessarily few) applications.

=== New uses ===
The LaserWriter printer became available shortly after the 512K's introduction, as well as the number pad, mic, tablet, keyboard, mouse, basic mouse, and much more. It utilized Apple's built-in networking scheme LocalTalk which allows sharing of devices among several users. The 512K was the oldest Macintosh capable of supporting Apple's AppleShare built-in file sharing network, when introduced in 1987. The expanded memory in the 512K allowed it to better handle large word-processing documents and make better use of the graphical user interface and generally increased speed over the 128K model.

Color Systems Technology used an army of 512K units connected to a custom Intel 80186-based machine to colorize numerous black-and-white films in the mid-1980s.

=== System software ===
The original 512K could accept Macintosh system software up to version 4.1; System Software 5 was possible if used with the Hard Disk 20.

== Upgrades ==
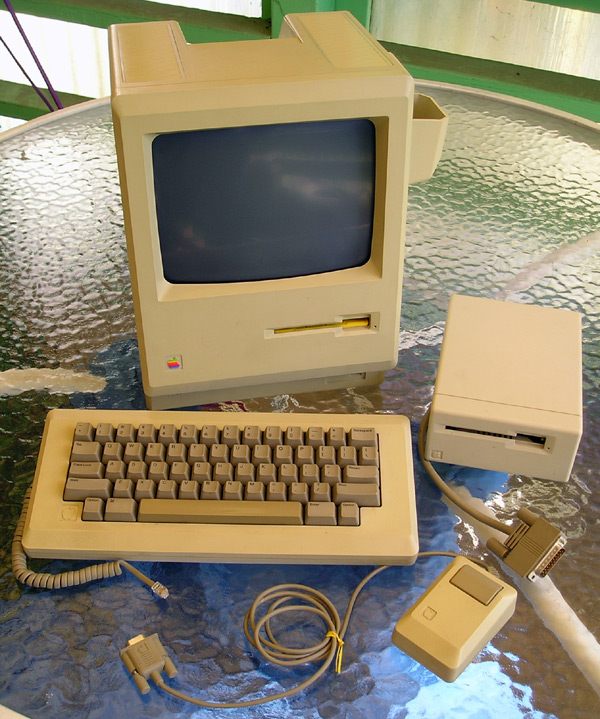
Mac 512K with accessories

An updated version replaced the Macintosh 512K and debuted as the Macintosh 512K enhanced in April 1986. It differed from the original 512K in that it had an 800 KB floppy disk drive and the same improved ROM as the Macintosh Plus. With the exception of the new model number (M0001E), they were otherwise cosmetically identical. The stock 512K could also use an 800 KB floppy disk drive as well as the Hard Disk 20, the first Macintosh hard disk from Apple, attaching to the floppy disk port. The Hard Disk 20 required 512 KB RAM and when used with the Macintosh 512K which had the old 64 KB ROM, a special system file on floppy disk that loaded the improved ROM code into RAM, thus reducing the RAM available for other uses. This was not required by the 512Ke. Apple offered an upgrade kit which replaced ROMs and the floppy disk drive with an 800 KB double-sided one, essentially turning it into a 512Ke. One further OEM upgrade replaced the logic board and the rear case entirely with that of the Macintosh Plus which had a SCSI port and 1 MB RAM expandable to 4 MB.

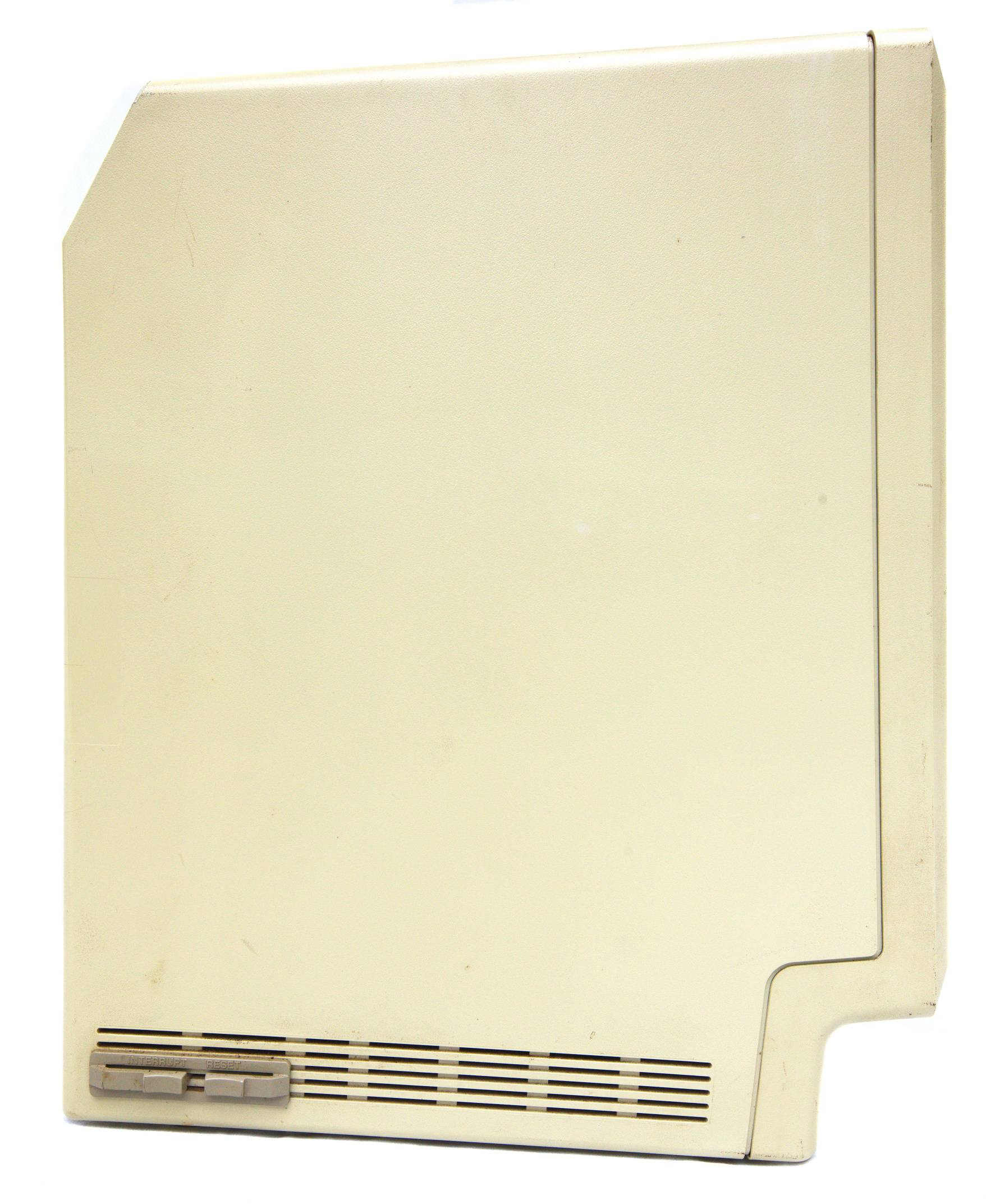
Mac 512K side-view showing interrupt and reset interface

As with the original Macintosh, the 512K was designed with no slots for upgrade boards and had no hard-disk controller, so the few internal upgrades that were available for the 512K, such as General Computer's US$2,795 Hyperdrive hard drive, had to plug directly into the 68000 processor socket. Other such upgrades included "snap-on" SCSI cards and RAM upgrades of 2 MB or more.

== Timeline ==
Timeline of Compact Macintosh models
See also: List of Mac models and Compact Macintosh

== See also ==
- Macintosh 128K/512K technical details
