= Apple ProFile =

Hard disk drive

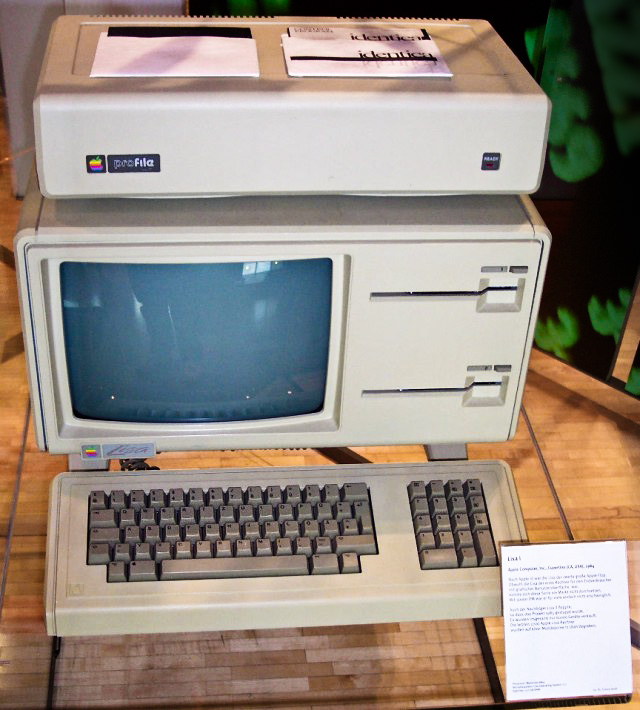
- Apple Lisa with a ProFile hard drive on top
- Developer: Apple Computer
- Type: Hard disk drive
- Released: September 1981
- Introductory price: US$3,499 (equivalent to $12,400 in 2025)
- Discontinued: September 1986

The ProFile (codenamed Pippin) is the first hard disk drive produced by Apple Computer, initially for use with the Apple III. The original model had a formatted capacity of 5 MB and connected to a special interface card that plugged into an Apple III slot. In 1983, Apple offered a ProFile interface card for the Apple II, with software support for Apple ProDOS and Apple Pascal.

Additionally, in 1983, Apple introduced the Lisa computer, which was normally sold with a ProFile. The ProFile could be connected to the built-in parallel port of the Lisa, or to a port on an optional dual-port parallel interface card. Up to three such interface cards could be installed, so in principle up to seven ProFile drives could be used on a Lisa.

The 5 MB ProFile was Apple's first hard drive, and was introduced in September 1981 at a price of US$3,499 (equivalent to $12,400 in 2025).

Later, a 10 MB model was offered, but required an upgraded PROM/interface card to recognize the additional 5 MB.

Internally, the ProFile consisted of a bare Seagate ST-506 stepper motor drive and mechanism, without the usual Seagate electronics, a digital and an analog circuit board designed and manufactured by Apple, and a power supply.

Later Lisa models could be configured with an internal 10 MB "Widget" voice-coil drive with a proprietary controller designed and built entirely by Apple, but the Widget was never offered as an external product for use with other Apple computers.

Apple did not offer another hard drive until it released the Hard Disk 20 designed specifically for the Macintosh 512K in September 1985 which could not be used on the Apple II or III families, or Lisa series. The ProFile could not be used on the Macintosh or the Apple IIc (for which Apple never offered an external hard disk drive of any kind).

By September 1986, the ProFile would be superseded by the introduction of the first cross-platform Hard Disk 20SC SCSI-based drive for the Macintosh and interface card for the Apple II family (excluding the IIc series, which had no SCSI interface of any kind) and Lisa/XL series.
