= Spacestation Pheta =

- Spacestation Pheta software icon
- Developers: T&T Software
- Platform: Macintosh
- Release: 1988–1995
- Genre: Platform
- Mode: Single-player

Gameplay screenshot

Spacestation Pheta is a video game for the Macintosh developed by T&T Software which was originally released as shareware in the late 1980s. It is a fast, multi-screen platform game, with each level (referred to as a "screen") containing features and obstacles such as transporters, ladders, cannons, trampolines, and so-called "materializers". The object of the game is to reach the end of each screen before running out of oxygen.

The registered version of Spacestation Pheta contains a hundred built-in screens, plus an editor for creating custom screens. There is also a "show me the solution" feature for those who get stuck. Other features include printable help, digitized sound effects, and optional color graphics.

Spacestation Pheta can be played on almost any 68k or PowerPC Macintosh computer, including compact black-and-white models such as the Macintosh Plus.

Sound effects in Spacestation Pheta were sampled by the electronic group Underworld.

A port of Spacestation Pheta was released on disk for the TI-99/4A home computer, written in Wycove Forth.
