= Macintosh External Disk Drive =

External floppy disk drive by Apple

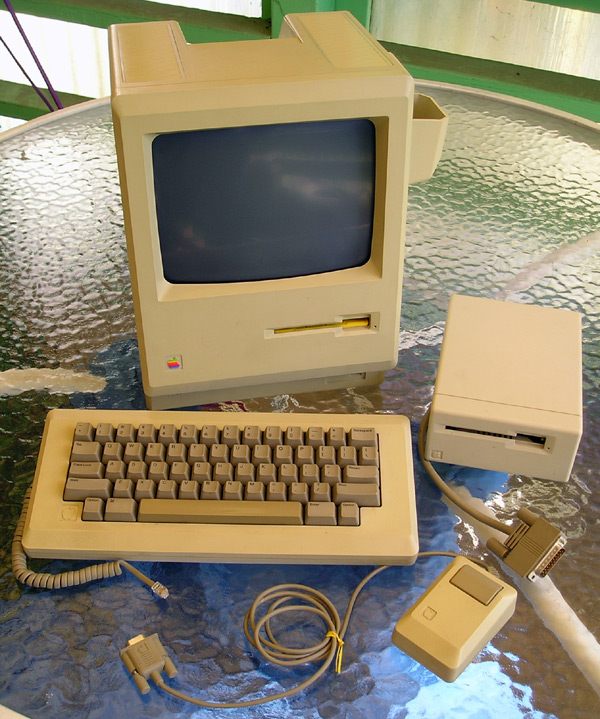
- Developer: Apple Computer
- Type: Disk drive
- Released: May 4, 1984
- Introductory price: US$495

The Macintosh External Disk Drive is the original model in a series of external 3 1/2-inch floppy disk drives manufactured and sold by Apple Computer exclusively for the Macintosh series of computers introduced in January 1984. Later, Apple unified their external drives to work cross-platform between the Macintosh and Apple II product lines, dropping the name "Macintosh" from the drives. Though Apple had been producing external floppy disk drives prior to 1984, they were exclusively developed for the Apple II, III and Lisa computers using the industry standard 5 1/4-inch flexible disk format. The Macintosh external drives were the first to widely introduce Sony's new 3 1/2-inch rigid disk standard commercially and throughout their product line. Apple produced only one external 3 1/2-inch drive exclusively for use with the Apple II series called the Apple UniDisk 3.5.

== 400K ==
The original Macintosh External Disk Drive (M0130) was introduced with the Macintosh on January 24, 1984. However, it did not actually ship until May 4, 1984, sixty days after Apple had promised it to dealers. Bill Fernandez was the project manager who oversaw the design and production of the drive. The drive case was designed to match the Macintosh and includes the same 400-kilobyte drive (a Sony-made 3 1/2-inch single-sided mechanism) installed inside the Macintosh. Although very similar to the 400-kilobyte drive which newly replaced Apple's ill-fated Twiggy drive in the Lisa, there are subtle differences relating mainly to the eject mechanism. However, confusingly all of these drives were labelled identically. The Macintosh can only support one external drive, limiting the number of floppy disks mounted at once to two, but both Apple and third party manufacturers developed external hard drives that connected to the Mac's floppy disk port, which had pass-through ports to accommodate daisy-chaining the external disk drive. Apple's Hard Disk 20 can accommodate an additional daisy-chained hard drive as well as an external floppy disk.

3.5-inch single-sided floppies had been used on several microcomputers and synthesizers in the early 1980s, including the Hewlett-Packard 150 and various MSX computers. The standard on all of these was MFM with 80 tracks and 9 sectors per track, giving 360 KB per disk. However, Apple's custom interface uses Group Coded Recording (GCR) and a unique format which puts fewer sectors on the smaller inner tracks and more sectors on the wider outer tracks of the disk. The disk speeds up when accessing the inner tracks and slows down when accessing the outer ones. This is called the "Zoned CAV" system; there are five zones of 16 tracks each. The innermost zone has 8 sectors per track, the next zone 9 sectors per track, and so on; the outermost zone has 12 sectors per track. This allows more space per disk (400 KB) and also improves reliability by reducing the number of sectors on the inner tracks which had less physical media to allocate to each sector.

The external 400-kilobyte Macintosh drive will work on any Macintosh that does not have a high density SuperDrive controller (due to electrical changes with the interface). The disks in practice only support the MFS file system. Although a 400-kilobyte disk may be formatted with HFS, it cannot be booted from, nor is it readable in a Macintosh 128K or 512K, which had the original 64K ROM.

Copy protection schemes were not as elaborate or widespread on Macintosh software as they were on Apple II software for several reasons. First, the Mac drives did not afford the same degree of low-level control. Also Apple did not publish source listings for the Mac OS ROMs as they did with the Apple II. Finally, the Mac OS routines were considerably more complex and disk access had to be synchronized with the mouse and keyboard.

== 800K ==
By early 1985, it was clear that the Macintosh needed additional storage space, in particular a hard drive. Apple announced their first hard drive for the Mac in March 1985. However, the MFS file system did not support subdirectories, making it unsuitable for a hard disk. Apple quickly began adopting for the Mac the hierarchical based SOS filing system introduced with the Apple III and long since implemented in ProDOS for the Apple II series and the Lisa. This change in the Mac's filing system delayed the introduction of the double sided Sony drives which Apple intended to offer as soon as the technology was available, a concession they made when adopting the Sony drives over their own problematic double-capacity Twiggy drives. However, based on the success of the 3.5-inch floppy drive for the Mac, there was no such obstacle in immediately implementing an 800-kilobyte drive for the Apple II, so it was introduced in September 1985, four months before the version for the Mac. While Apple simultaneously introduced their new hard drive after a 6-month delay, they chose not to implement the new floppy drive for the Macintosh at that time.

=== Apple UniDisk 3.5 ===
In September 1985, Apple released its first 3 1/2-inch drive (A2M2053) for the Apple II series utilizing Sony's new 800-kilobyte double-sided drive mechanism, which would not be released for the Macintosh until four months later. The Apple UniDisk 3.5 drive contained additional circuitry making it an "intelligent" or "smart" drive; this made it incompatible with the Macintosh, despite having the identical mechanism that was to be later used in the Macintosh drive. However, if the internal circuit board (which consisted of its own CPU, IWM chip, RAM and firmware) was bypassed it could operate on a Macintosh as an 800-kilobyte drive. This permitted storage-hungry Mac users the ability to double their disk capacity 5 months before Apple officially made an 800-kilobyte drive available for the Mac. At the time, the HD20 Startup disk came with HFS and a new ".Sony" driver that supported 800K drives (in addition to the HD20). Ironically, though the drive would prove to be significantly faster than the previous 400-kilobyte drive, it was specifically slowed down to accommodate the slower 1-megahertz processor of the Apple II. It came in the Snow White-styled case and color to match the Apple IIc and had a pass-through connector for the addition of a second daisy-chained drive. It plugged in directly to the Apple IIc disk port (although original IIcs needed a ROM upgrade) and required a specialized interface card on earlier Apple II models. It would later also work directly with the built-in disk port on the Apple IIc Plus and Apple IIGS through backwards compatibility. This was not recommended for the latter two machines as the Apple 3.5" Drive was faster. It continued to be sold for use with the Apple IIc and IIe which could not use the subsequent replacement Apple 3 1/2-inch drive, until the Apple IIc Plus redesign in 1988 and Apple II 3.5 Disk Controller Card released in 1991. Apple developed a DuoDisk 3.5 which contained two drives vertically stacked, but never brought it to market. The 3 1/2-inch format was not very popular in the Apple II community (excluding the 16-bit Apple IIGS) as most software was released in the 5.25-inch format to accommodate the existing installed Disk II drives.

=== Macintosh 800K External Drive ===
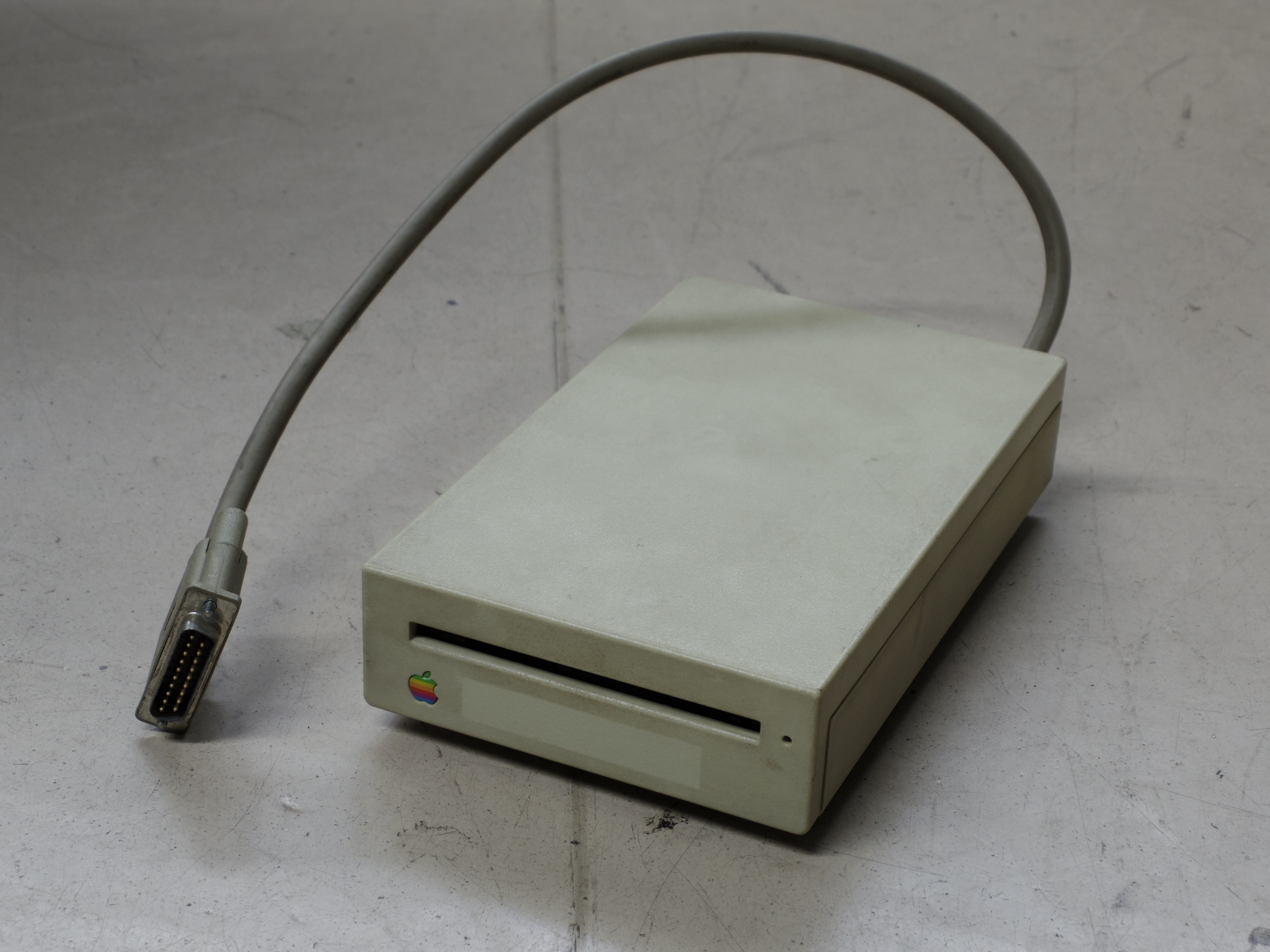
Apple 800K External Drive (M0131)

In January 1986, Apple introduced the Macintosh Plus which had a Sony double-sided 800-kilobyte capacity disk drive, and used the new HFS disk format providing directories and sub-directories. This drive was fitted into an external case as the Macintosh 800K External Drive (M0131), which was slimmer than the earlier 400-kilobyte drive. It could be used with Macintosh models except for the original 128K, which could not load the HFS disk format. The drive supported the older 400-kilobyte single-sided disks allowing them to be shared. The use of Apple's GCR with variable speed (as used on the 400-kilobyte drive) accommodated a higher storage capacity than its 720-kilobyte PC counterparts. In addition, the mechanism was much quieter and significantly faster than its predecessor. Designed primarily to run on Macs with the new 128-kilobyte ROM which contained the necessary code to support the drive, it could be used with Macs with older 64-kilobyte ROMs if the proper software was loaded from the system folder of a Hard Disk 20 into the Mac's RAM. The drive controlled its own speed and was no longer dependent on an external signal from the Mac, which was blocked on the early drive mechanisms compatible only with the Macintosh. Later universal mechanisms, first used on the Apple II to accommodate proprietary signals, required special cables to isolate the speed signal from the Mac, to prevent damage to the drive. However, with its increased storage capacity combined with 2-4 times the RAM available on the Mac Plus, the external drive was less of a necessity than it had been with its predecessors. Nevertheless, with the only option for adding additional storage being extremely expensive hard drives, a year later Apple increased the maximum number of floppy drives that could be accessed simultaneously to three on the Macintosh SE (the Macintosh Portable was the only other Mac to do so).

=== Apple 3.5 Drive ===
Beginning in September 1986, Apple adopted a unified cross-platform product strategy essentially eliminating platform-specific peripherals where possible. The Apple 3.5 Drive (A9M0106) is an 800K external drive released in conjunction with the Apple IIGS computer and replaced the beige-colored Macintosh 800K External Drive. It works on both the Apple IIGS as well as the Macintosh. It came in a case similar to the UniDisk, but in Platinum gray. Like the UniDisk 3.5, the Apple 3.5 Drive includes Apple II-specific features such as a manual disk eject button and a daisy-chain connector which allows two drives to be connected to an Apple II computer. The Macintosh however could still only accommodate one external drive, and ignores use of the eject button. Unlike the Macintosh 800K External Drive, the Apple 3.5 Drive can be used natively with the 64-kilobyte ROM stock Macintosh 128K & 512K computers without the HD20 INIT, albeit only with 400K MFS formatted disks. Designed as a universal external drive replacement, the Apple 3.5 Drive was eventually made compatible with the remaining Apple II models in production upon the introduction of the Apple IIc Plus and the Apple II 3.5 Disk Controller Card for the Apple IIe.

== 1.44MB ==
Following the success of the Macintosh implementation of the 3 1/2-inch format, the format was also adopted widely by the personal computer industry. However most of the industry adopted a different Modified Frequency Modulation (MFM) formatting scheme at a fixed rotational speed, incompatible with Apple's own GCR with variable speed, resulting in a less-expensive drive, but with a lower capacity (720 KB rather than 800 KB). In 1987 a newer and better, MFM-based, "high-density" format was developed which IBM first introduced in their PS/2 systems, doubling the previous storage capacity to 1.4 MB. In Apple's pursuit of cross-compatibility with MS-DOS and Windows-based systems to attract more business customers, they adopted the new format, thus confirming it as the first industry-wide floppy disk standard. However, Apple could not take advantage of the less expensive fixed-speed systems of the IBM-based computers, due to its backward incompatibility with their own variable-speed formats.

=== Apple FDHD Drive ===
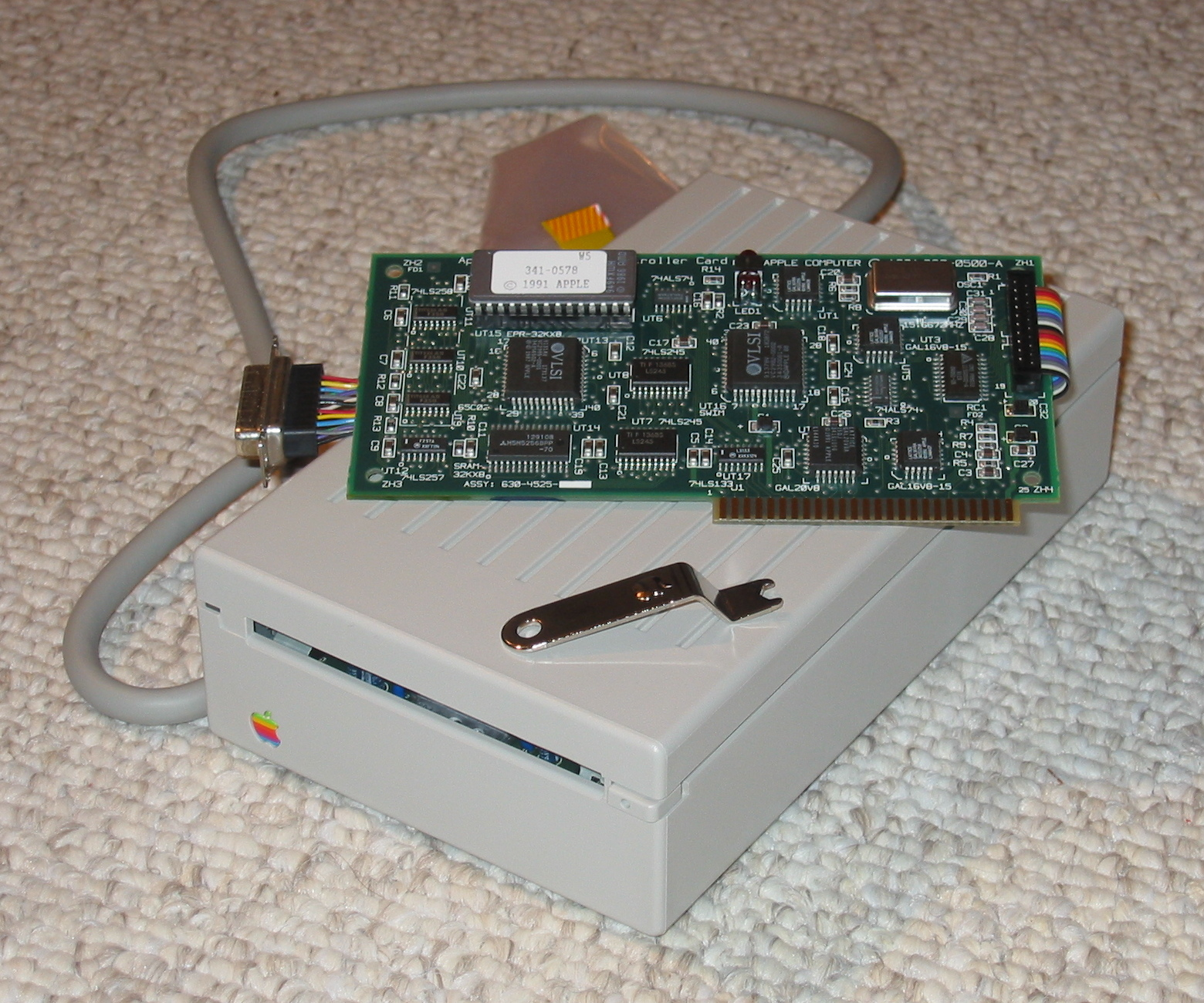
Apple II 3.5 Disk Controller Card & Apple SuperDrive

Later renamed the Apple SuperDrive (G7287), the Apple FDHD Drive (Floppy Disk High Density) was introduced in 1989 as Apple's first external 1.44 MB high-density double-sided 3 1/2-inch floppy drive. It supported all of Apple's 3.5" floppy disk formats as well as all standard PC formats (e.g. MS-DOS, Windows), allowing the Macintosh to read and write all industry-standard floppy disk formats. The external drive was offered only briefly with support for the Apple II, coming late in that product's life. To take advantage of the drive's extended storage and new capabilities, it required the new SWIM (Sander–Wozniak Integrated Machine) floppy disk controller chip to be present on the Macintosh and Apple II, the latter requiring the Apple II 3.5 Disk Controller Card which integrated the chip. If the drive was connected to an older Macintosh, Apple IIGS or Apple IIc Plus with the older IWM (Integrated Woz Machine) chip, the drive would act as a standard 800K drive, without any additional capabilities. The interface card was necessary for the Apple IIGS to make use of its greater storage capacity and ability to handle PC formats. The Apple IIe could not utilize the drive in any form, unless it had the specialized interface card installed, much like the UniDisk 3.5 which the SuperDrive replaced. The last Mac it could be used with was the Classic II and was discontinued shortly thereafter. The drive was fitted in every desktop Mac from its introduction and was eliminated with the introduction of the iMac in 1998. PowerPC Macs dropped the original auto-inject Sony drives and went to a manual-inject mechanism.

=== Macintosh HDI-20 External 1.4MB Floppy Disk Drive ===
Manufactured exclusively for use with the Macintosh PowerBook line, the Macintosh HDI-20 External 1.44MB Floppy Disk Drive (M8061) contained a low-powered, slimmer version of the SuperDrive and used a small square HDI-20 proprietary connector, rather than the larger standard DE-19 desktop connector, and was powered directly by the laptop. It had a matching dark gray case and an access cover which flipped down to form a stand. The external drive was sold optionally for those PowerBooks which had no built-in drive, however, the identical drive mechanism was included internally in some PowerBook models, which otherwise had no provision to accommodate an external drive.

=== Macintosh PowerBook 2400c Floppy Disk Drive ===
Compatible only with the PowerBook 2400c, the Macintosh PowerBook 2400c Floppy Disk Drive (M4327) used a unique Molex connector rather than the previous HDI-20 connector. Possibly because of the 2400c's IBM design heritage, both the drive and the computer use the same connectors as IBM ThinkPad external floppy drives from the same period; however, IBM drives are not electrically compatible. The drive was discontinued in 1998 and would be the last external floppy drive manufactured by Apple.

== See also ==
- List of Apple drives
- Macintosh File System
- History of the floppy disk
- Timeline of Apple Inc. products
