= Apple Tape Backup 40SC =

Mini-cartridge tape drive by Apple

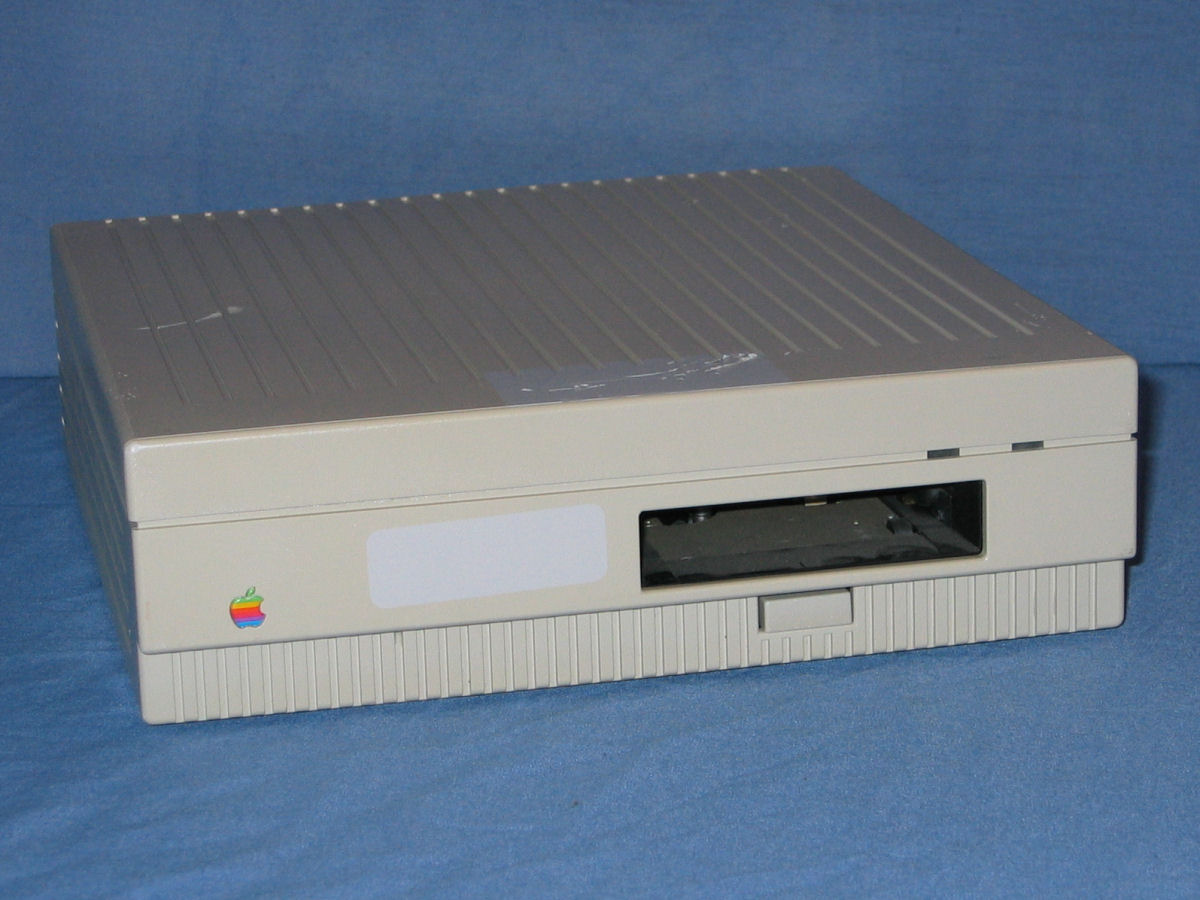
- Introduced: 1987
- Discontinued: 1994
- Cost: US$1,499 (equivalent to $4,248 in 2025)
- Type: Tape drive
- Connection: SCSI
- Ports: 2 SCSI ports
- Power consumption: 15 – 60 watts
- Weight: 7.3 lb (3.3 kg)
- Dimensions: 246 mm (W) × 266 mm (D) × 78 mm (H)

The Apple Tape Backup 40SC is an external, SCSI-interfaced, 1/4-inch (6.35 mm) QIC, mini-cartridge tape drive. It was introduced by Apple Inc. in 1987 and discontinued in 1994. The drive came bundled with Retrospect backup software. The drive is also compatible with the tape software included with A/UX.

== Technical specifications ==
- Recording media: Industry-standard, DC 2000 1/4-inch (6.35 mm) QIC mini-cartridge.
- Formatted capacity: 38.5 megabytes.
- Block size: 8,192 bytes.
- Transfer rate: 1.25 megabyte per second.
- Interface: SCSI. Connected directly to Macintosh Plus, Macintosh SE or Macintosh II via a 50-pin SCSI port or to a compatible hard disk drive.
- Volume backup time: Approximately 17–18 minutes per 20 megabytes.

== See also ==
- List of Apple drives
