= Disk II =

Floppy disk drive for the Apple II computer

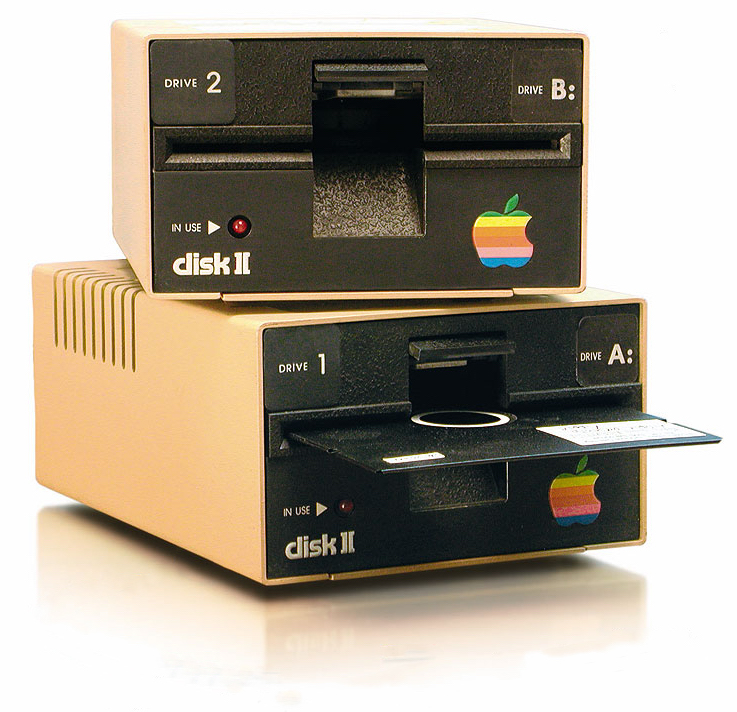
Disk II drives

The Disk II Floppy Disk Subsystem, often rendered as Disk ][, is a 5 1/4-inch floppy disk drive designed by Steve Wozniak at the recommendation of Mike Markkula, and manufactured by Apple Computer. It went on sale in June 1978 at a retail price of US$495 for pre-order; it was later sold for $595 (equivalent to $2,940 in 2025) including the controller card (which can control up to two drives) and cable. The Disk II was designed specifically for use with the 1977 Apple II personal computer to replace the slower cassette tape storage.

Apple produced at least six variants of the basic 5 1/4-inch Disk II concept over the course of the Apple II series' lifetime: The Disk II, the Disk III, the DuoDisk, the Disk IIc, the UniDisk 5.25" and the Apple 5.25 Drive. While all of these drives look different, and use four different connector types, they're all electronically extremely similar. They can all use the same low-level disk format, and are all interchangeable with the use of simple adapters, consisting of no more than two plugs and wires between them. Most DuoDisk drives, the Disk IIc, the UniDisk 5.25" and the AppleDisk 5.25" even use the same 19-pin D-Sub connector, so they are directly interchangeable. The only 5 1/4" drive Apple sold aside from the Disk II family was a 360k MFM unit made to allow Mac IIs and SEs to read PC floppy disks.

This is not the case with Apple's 3 1/2-inch drives, which use several different disk formats and several different interfaces, electronically quite dissimilar even in models using the same connector; they are not generally interchangeable.

== History ==
=== Disk II ===
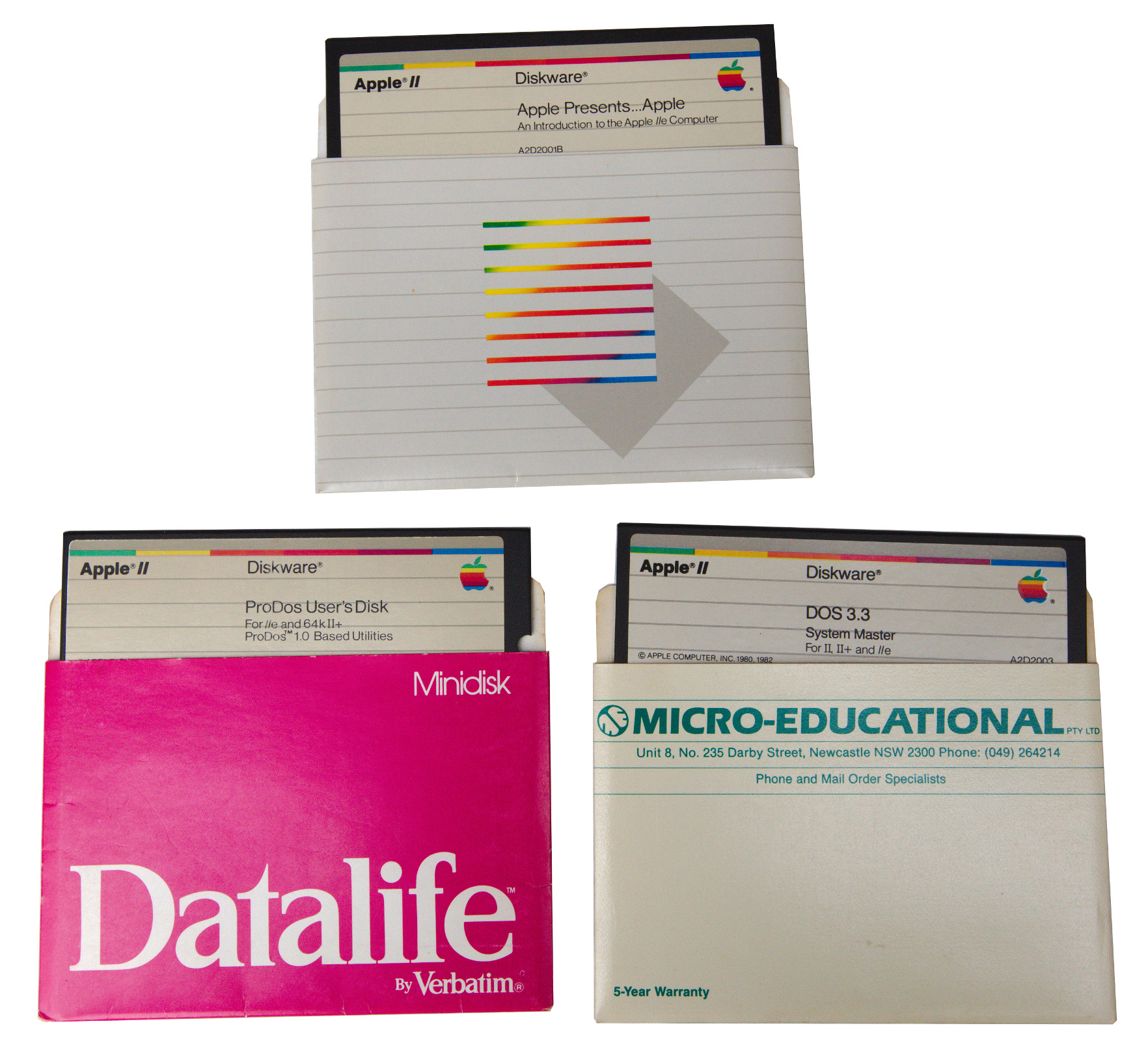
A selection of Apple IIe software, intended to be read through the Disk II system

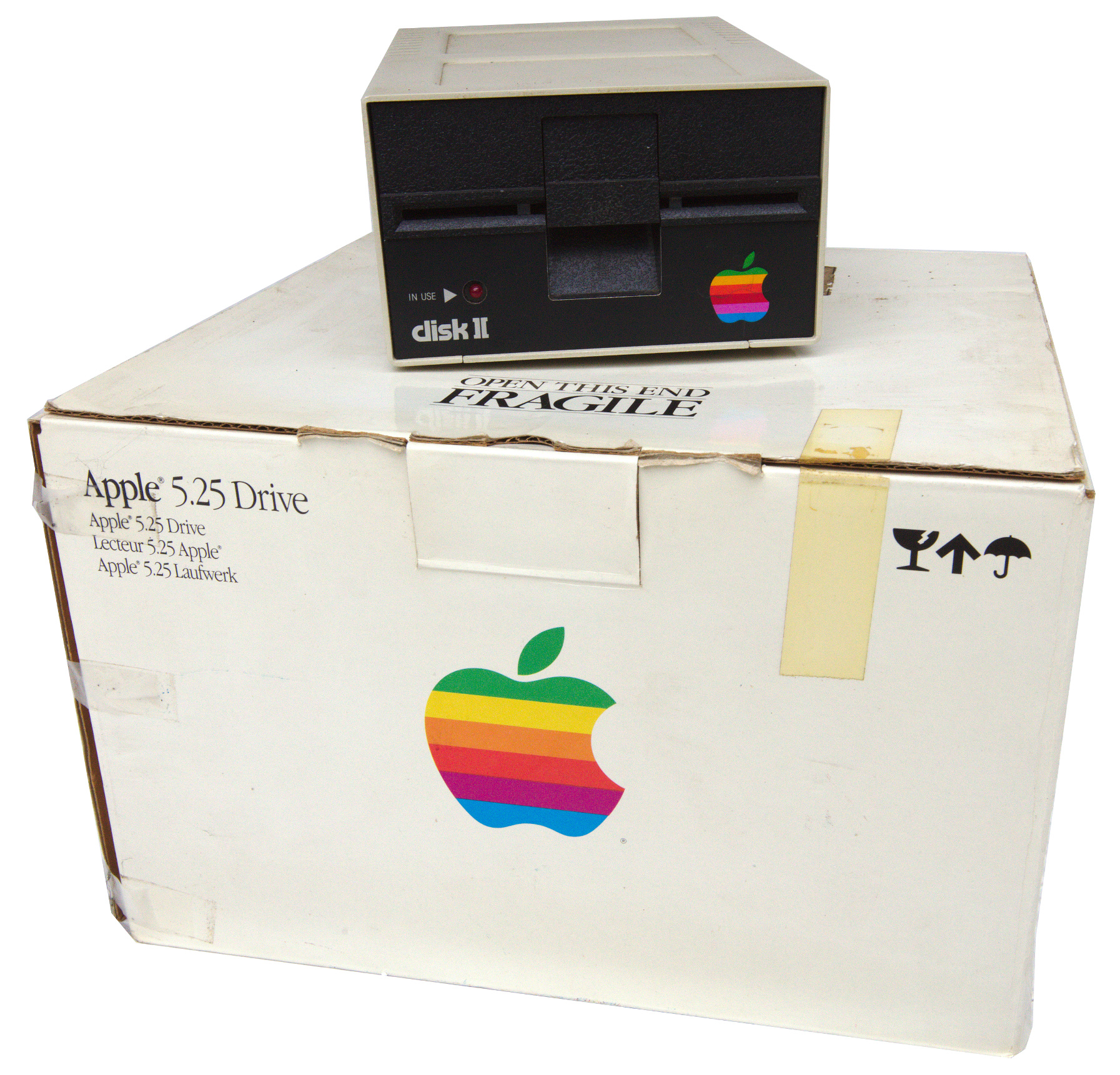
Disk II atop an original box for the Apple 5.25 Drive

Apple did not originally offer a disk drive for the Apple II, which used data cassette storage like other microcomputers of the time. Apple early investor and executive Mike Markkula asked cofounder Steve Wozniak to design a drive system for the computer after finding that a checkbook-balancing program Markkula had written took too long to load from tape. Wozniak knew nothing about disk controllers, but while at Hewlett-Packard he had designed a simple, five-chip circuit to operate a Shugart Associates drive.

The Apple II's lack of a disk drive was "a glaring weakness" in what was otherwise intended to be a polished, professional product. Speaking later, Osborne 1 designer Lee Felsenstein stated, "The difference between cassette and disk systems was the difference between hobbyist devices and a computer. You couldn't have expected, say, VisiCalc, to run on a cassette system." Recognizing that the II needed a disk drive to be taken seriously, Apple set out to develop a disk drive and a DOS to run it. Wozniak spent the 1977 Christmas holidays adapting his controller design, which reduced the number of chips used by a factor of 10 compared to existing controllers. Working with Randy Wigginton, he also wrote a basic program to demonstrate the drive at the Consumer Electronics Show in Las Vegas in January 1978. They finished it overnight in Las Vegas, hours before the show opened. Still lacking a DOS, and with Wozniak inexperienced in operating system design, Steve Jobs approached Shepardson Microsystems with the project. On April 10, 1978, Apple signed a contract for $13,000 with Shepardson to develop the DOS.

Shortly after the disk drive project began in late 1977, Steve Jobs made several trips to Shugart's offices announcing that he wanted a disk drive that would cost just $100. After Wozniak finished studying IBM disk controller designs, Jobs then demanded that Shugart sell them a stripped disk drive that had no controller board, index sensor, load solenoids, or track zero sensor. Although puzzled by this request, Shugart complied and provided Apple with 25 drive mechanisms that they could use as prototypes in developing a disk system for the Apple II. The prototypes received the designation of SA-390.

Wozniak studied North Star Computers and others' more complex floppy controllers. He believed that his simpler design lacked their features, but realized that they were less sophisticated; for example, his could use soft-sectored disks. Following the Shugart controller's manual, Wozniak attempted to develop an FM-type controller with 10 sector per track storage, but realized that Group Coded Recording could fit 13 sectors per track. Wozniak called the resultant Disk II system "my most incredible experience at Apple and the finest job I did", and credited it and VisiCalc with the Apple II's success.

Steve Wozniak found out that some of the SA-390 drives didn't work without adjustments while others simply wouldn't work at all. Fellow engineer Cliff Huston came up with several procedures for resuscitating the faulty drives on the assembly line. When Apple sent an order into Shugart for more SA-390s, a Shugart engineer admitted that the disk drive manufacturer had played a trick on Apple and that the SA-390s were actually rejected SA-400s that had failed to pass factory inspection. The idea was that Apple couldn't get the drives to work and would be forced to go back and purchase more expensive SA-400s.

The Disk II was very successful for Apple, being the cheapest floppy disk system ever sold up to that point and immensely profitable for the company, in addition to having nearly 20% more storage space than standard FM drives. For a while, the only direct competitor in the microcomputer industry was the TRS-80 Model I, which had used only standard FM storage for 85k. The Atari 8-bit computer's disk drives' throughputs were much slower than the Disk II's 15 kbit/s, seriously affecting their ability to compete in the business market. However, the advantage of Wozniak's design was somewhat nullified when the cost of double-density MFM controllers dropped only a year after the Disk II's introduction.

The initial Disk II drives (A2M0003) were modifications of the Shugart SA-400, which was the first commercially available 5 1/4-inch diskette drive. Apple purchased only the bare drive mechanisms without the standard SA-400 controller board, replaced it with Wozniak's board design, and then stamped the Apple rainbow logo onto the faceplate. Early production at Apple was handled by two people, and they assembled 30 drives a day. By 1982, Apple switched to Alps drives for cost reasons.

Normal storage capacity per disk side was 113.75 KiB with Apple DOS 3.2.1 and earlier (256 bytes per sector, 13 sectors per track, 35 tracks per side), or 140 KiB with DOS 3.3 and ProDOS (256 bytes per sector, 16 sectors per track, 35 tracks per side). The 16-sector hardware upgrade introduced in 1980 for use with DOS 3.3 modified only the controller card firmware to use a more efficient GCR code called "6 and 2 encoding". Neither the drive itself nor the physical bit density was changed. This update had the disadvantage of not automatically booting older 13 sector Apple II software.

The stock SA-400 drives had a head load solenoid that would lift the read/write heads from contact with the disk when it was not being accessed; this was a feature inherited from 8" drives which had a continuously running stepper motor powered off the A/C line, causing the disk to be rotating nonstop as long as the drive door was closed. Wozniak decided this was unnecessary as the SA-400 mechanism did not operate the motor except during disk access and there was minimal risk of wear to the disk media. As the Disk II proved that head load solenoids were not needed on 5.25" drives, most drive manufacturers subsequently omitted them.

Since the Disk II controller was completely software-operated, the user had total control over the encoding and format so long as it was within the physical limits of the drive mechanism and media. This also allowed software companies to use all sorts of ingenious copy protection schemes.

The Shugart SA-400, from which the Disk II was adapted, was a single-sided, 35-track drive. However, it was common for users to manually flip the disk to utilize the opposite side, after cutting a second notch on the diskette's protective shell to allow write-access. Most commercial software using more than one disk side was shipped on such "flippy" disks as well. Only one side could be accessed at once, but it did essentially double the capacity of each floppy diskette, an important consideration especially in the early years when media was still quite expensive.

In the Disk II, the full-height drive mechanism shipped inside a beige-painted metal case and connected to the controller card via a 20-pin ribbon cable; the controller card was plugged into one of the bus slots on the Apple's mainboard. The connector is very easy to misalign on the controller card, which will short out a certain IC in the drive; if later connected correctly, a drive damaged this way will delete data from any disk inserted into it as soon as it starts spinning, even write-protected disks such as those used to distribute commercial software. This problem resulted in numerous customer complaints and repairs, which led to Apple printing warning messages in their user's manuals to explain how to properly install the connector. They used different connectors that could not be misaligned in later drives. DB-19 adapters for the original Disk II were eventually available for use with Apple's later connector standard.

Up to 14 drives could be attached to one Apple II or Apple IIe computer - two drives per controller card, one card per slot, and there were seven usable slots per computer. While the DOS and ProDOS operating systems worked equally well with the card in any of the normal slots (i.e. all except slot 0 of the Apple II/II+ or the special memory expansion slots of the later models), Apple's printed manuals suggested using slot 6 for the first controller card; most Apple II software expects this slot to be used for the main 5 1/4-inch disk drive and fails otherwise. A Bell & Howell version of the Disk II was also manufactured by Apple in a black painted case, which matched the color of the Bell & Howell version of the Apple II Plus, which Apple was already manufacturing.

=== Disk III ===
In 1978, Apple intended to develop its own "FileWare" drive mechanism for use in the new Apple /// and Lisa business computers then being developed. They quickly ran into difficulties with the mechanisms, which precluded them from being incorporated in the Apple ///. That machine thus continued to use the same Shugart design as the Disk II.

The first variation of the Disk II introduced for the Apple ///, called the Disk III (A3M0004), used the identical drive mechanism inside a modified plastic case with a proprietary connector. With some modification both drives are interchangeable. Though Apple sought to force the purchase of new drives with the Apple ///, many former Apple II users quickly devised a way to adapt their existing and cheaper Disk II drives; however, only one external Disk II was supported in this manner. The Disk III was the first to allow daisy chaining of up to three additional drives to the single 26-pin ribbon cable connector on the Apple ///, for a total of 4 floppy disk drives – the Apple /// was the first Apple to contain a built-in drive mechanism. The Apple III Plus changed its 26-pin connector to a DB-25 connector, which required an adapter for use with the Disk III.

=== FileWare ===
In 1983, Apple finally announced a single and dual external drive (UniFile and DuoFile) implementing the 871-kilobyte "FileWare" mechanism used in the original Apple Lisa, as a replacement for the Disk II & /// drives. However, due to the reliability problems of the Apple-built "Twiggy" drive mechanisms, the products never shipped.

=== DuoDisk ===
In 1984, shortly after the introduction of the Apple IIe the previous year, Apple offered a combination of two, two third-height, 140-kilobyte Disk II drive mechanisms side-by-side in a single plastic case, called the DuoDisk (A9M0108), which can not be daisy-chained. The unit was designed to be stacked on top of the computer, and beneath the monitor. Each unit requires its own disk controller card (as each card can still control only two drives) and the number of units is thus limited to the number of available slots; in practice, few uses of the Apple II computer can make good use of more than two 5 1/4-inch drives, so this limitation matters little. Originally released with a DB-25 connector to match that of the Apple III Plus, it was the first to adopt Apple's standard DB-19 floppy drive connector.

=== Disk IIc ===
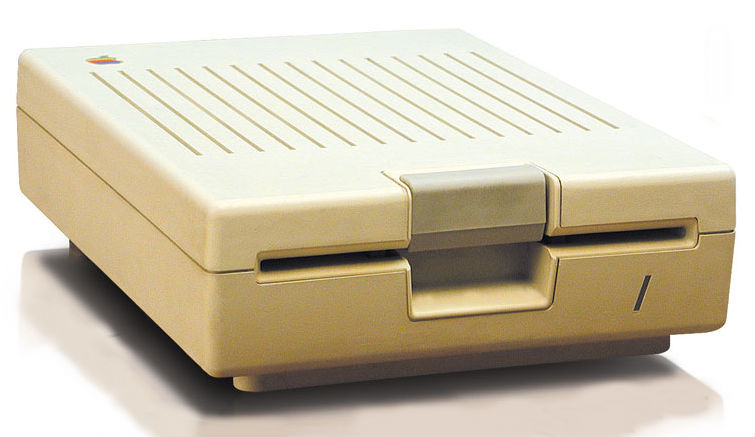
Disk IIc drive

The Disk IIc (A2M4050) was a half-height 5 1/4-inch floppy disk drive introduced by Apple Computer in 1984 styled for use alongside the Apple IIc personal computer, the only Apple II to contain a 5 1/4-inch built-in disk drive mechanism. The disk port on the original IIc was only designed to control one additional, external 5 1/4-inch disk drive, and as such, this particular drive omitted a daisy-chain port in back. It was possible to use it on other Apple II models, so long as it came last in the chain of drive devices (due to lacking a daisy-chain port); but since the Disk IIc was sold without a controller card, the Apple IIc computer needing none, it had to be adapted to an existing Disk II controller card in this case. Essentially the same as the full-height Disk II, Apple sold the Disk IIc for US$329, and other companies later sold similar drives for less.

=== UniDisk and Apple 5.25 Drive ===
Just over a year after the release of the DuoDisk, Apple introduced the UniDisk (A9M0104) in a plastic case whose styling was similar to that of the DuoDisk. After the release of the UniDisk 3.5 a few months later, the UniDisk was often informally referred to as the "UniDisk 5.25" to distinguish the similarly named drives.

Since the UniDisk could fully replace the Disk II in all its uses, the original Disk II was discontinued at this point.

In 1986 a Platinum-gray version of the drive named the Apple 5.25 Drive (A9M0107) was introduced alongside the first Platinum-colored computer, the Apple IIGS. The drive's name was similar to that of the Apple 3.5 Drive, also released with the IIGS.

Like the DuoDisk and Disk IIc before them, the UniDisk and Apple 5.25 Drive were half-height disk mechanisms inside an individual drive enclosure. Both drives featured a daisy chain pass-through port. While the drives were essentially interchangeable among Apple II computers, both with each other and with the earlier drives, minor electrical differences dictated that only the Apple 5.25 Drive could be used with the later (ROM 3) version of the Apple IIGS and with the Apple IIe Card on a Macintosh LC.

=== 3 1/2-inch drive ===
In 1984, Apple had opted for the more modern, Sony-designed 3 1/2-inch floppy disk in late-model Lisas and the new Apple Macintosh. Accordingly, they attempted to introduce a new 3 1/2-inch 800-kilobyte floppy disk format for the Apple II series as well, to eventually replace the 140-kilobyte Disk II format. However, the external UniDisk 3.5 drive required a ROM upgrade (for existing Apple IIc machines; new ones shipped after this time had it from the factory) or a new kind of disk controller card (the so-called "Liron Card", for the Apple IIe) to be used. The much larger capacity and higher bitrate of the 3 1/2-inch drives made it impractical to use the software-driven Disk II controller because the 1-megahertz 6502 CPU in the Apple II line was too slow to be able to read them. Thus, a new and much more advanced (and correspondingly expensive) hardware floppy controller had to be used. And many original Apple IIs could not use the new controller card at all without further upgrades. Also, almost all commercial software for the Apple II series continued to be published on 5 1/4-inch disks which had a much larger installed base. For these reasons the 3 1/2-inch format was not widely accepted by Apple II users.

The Apple 3.5 Drive used the same 800-kilobyte format as the UniDisk 3.5, but it did away with the internal controller, which made it cheaper. Unlike all earlier Apple II drives, it was designed to work with the Macintosh too, and among Apple II models, it was compatible only with the Apple IIGS and the Apple IIc+ models, which both had a faster main CPU. On the Apple IIGS, whose improved audiovisual capacities really demanded a higher-capacity disk format as well, the 3 1/2-inch format was accepted by users and became the standard format.

Apple eventually offered a 1.44-megabyte SuperDrive with matching controller card for the Apple II series as well.

the 5 1/4-inch Disk II format drives continued to be offered alongside the newer 3 1/2-inch drives and remained the standard on the non-IIGS models until the platform was discontinued in 1993.

Officially, the following 3 1/2-inch drives could be used on the Apple II:

- Apple 3.5" External (A9M0106) – Designed for Apple IIs with the Liron or Superdrive controller or all Macintoshes with an external 19-pin floppy port (Mac 512s must be booted from the internal 400-kilobyte drive with the HD20 INIT, which provides HFS file system support – the Macintosh 128K will not work with this). The drive can be daisy chained, however this feature is not supported on the Macintosh.
- Unidisk 3.5" Drive (A2M2053) – Designed for Apple IIs with the Liron or Superdrive controller (not compatible with Macintoshes) Recommended only for 8-bit Apple IIs as the A9M0106 operates faster on the IIGS
- Apple FDHD External (G7287) – Supports 720-kilobyte/1.44-megabyte MFM floppy disks in addition to 800-kilobyte GCR. Designed for Apple IIs and Macs with the Superdrive controller, but will also work on machines with the older 800-kilobyte controller (as an 800-kilobyte drive – note that the G7287 is not compatible with the Mac 128/512)

The 400-kilobyte and 800-kilobyte Macintosh external drives (M0130 and M0131) are incompatible with standard Apple II controllers as they do not support the drives' automatic disk-eject feature, although they could be used with third-party controllers.

=== Apple PC 5.25" Drive ===
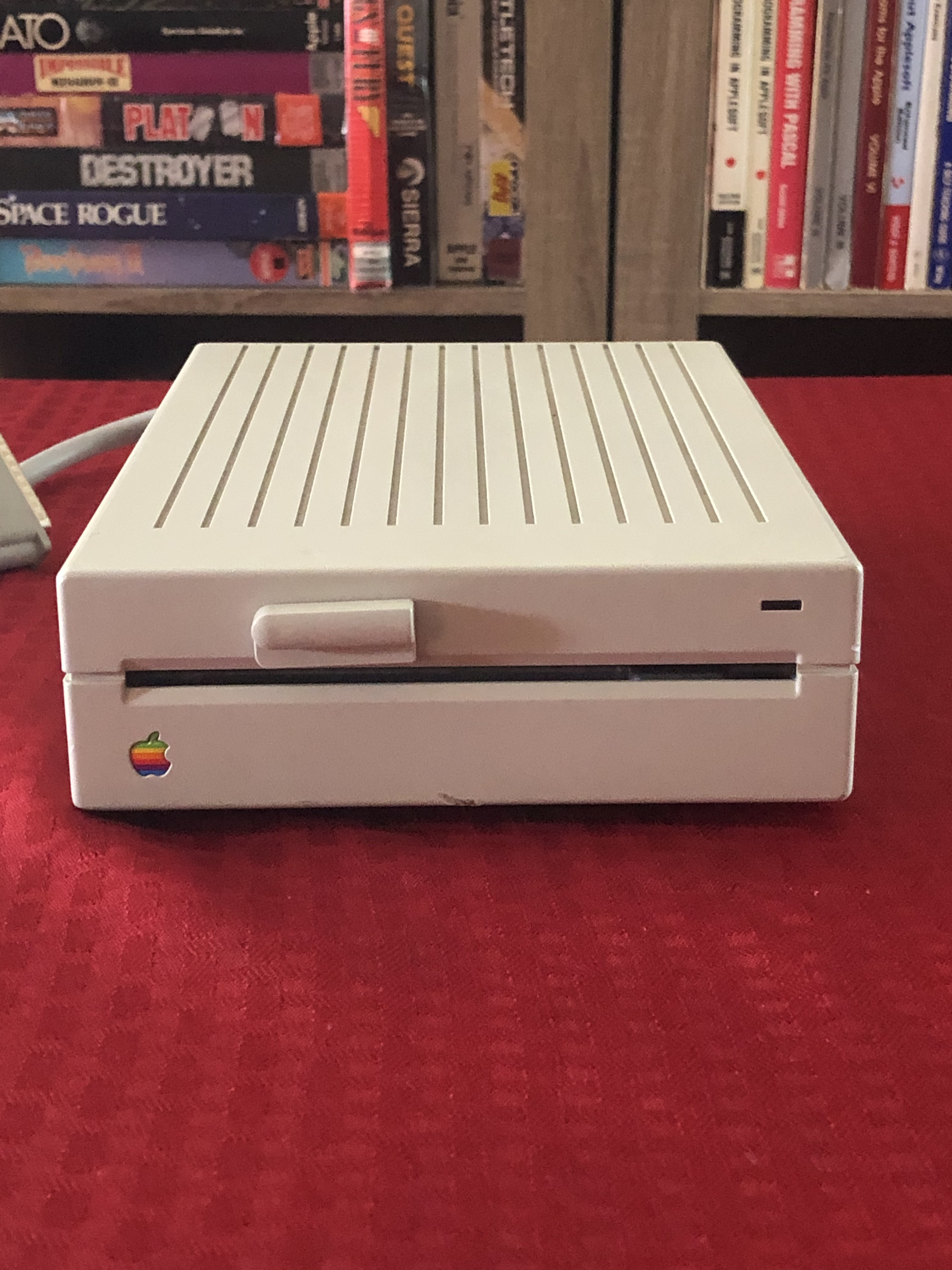
Apple PC 5.25" Drive

There is one 5 1/4-inch drive made by Apple that is completely incompatible with all the drives named above. In 1987, Apple sought to better compete in the IBM dominated business market by offering a means of cross-compatibility. Alongside the release of the Macintosh SE & Macintosh II, Apple released the Apple PC 5.25" Drive which required a separate custom PC 5.25 Floppy Disk Controller Card, different for each Mac model. It is the only 5 1/4-inch drive manufactured by Apple that can be used by the Macintosh.

This drive was for use with industry standard double-sided 5 1/4-inch 360-kilobyte formatted flexible disks. It was similar in appearance to the Disk IIc. Through the use of a special Macintosh Apple File Exchange utility shipped with it, the drive could read files from, and write files to, floppy disks in MS-DOS formats. Software "translators" could convert documents between WordStar and MacWrite formats, among others. The drive is incompatible with all Apple II computers and the Apple IIe Card for the Macintosh LC as well; it also does not allow a Macintosh to read from or write to 5 1/4-inch Apple II-formatted disks.

This drive was made obsolete by the industry-wide adoption of 3 1/2-inch disks and was replaced by the 3 1/2-inch Apple FDHD Drive, which could read and write every existing Macintosh, DOS and Windows format, and the Apple II ProDOS format as well.

== Disk II cable pinout ==
This table shows the pinout of the original 1979 Disk II controller and newer 1983 Uni/Duo Disk I/O controller (655–0101).

The circuitry of these two controllers are identical. The Disk II header pin numbering is per the Disk II controller card silkscreen and the circuit schematic given in the DOS 3.3 manual. The Uni/Duo Disk D-19 pinout is taken from the Apple //c Reference Manual, Volume 1.

| Disk II Header Pin | DuoDisk/Disk IIc/UniDisk/Apple Disk D-19 Pin | DuoDisk/UniDisk/Apple Disk Controller Card Cable Color | Signal Name | Description |
|---|---|---|---|---|
| 1,3,5,7 | 1,2,3,4 | Brown,Orange,Green,Violet | GND | Ground reference and supply |
| 2 | 11 | Red | SEEKPH0 | Phase 0 stepper motor signal |
| 4 | 12 | Yellow | SEEKPH1 | Phase 1 stepper motor signal |
| 6 | 13 | Blue | SEEKPH2 | Phase 2 stepper motor signal |
| 8 | 14 | Grey | SEEKPH3 | Phase 3 stepper motor signal |
| 9 | 5 | White | -12V | -12 volt supply |
| 10 | 15 | Black | WRREQ* | Write request signal |
| 11,12 | 6,16 | Brown,Red | +5V | +5 volt supply |
| 13,15,17,19 | 7,8 | Orange,Green | +12V | +12 volt supply |
| 14 | 17 | Yellow | DR2* (ENABLE*) | Drive 2 select/Drive enable signal |
| 16 | 18 | Blue | RDDATA | Read data signal |
| 18 | 19 | Grey | WRDATA | Write data signal |
| 20 | 10 | White | WRPROT | Write protect signal |
| x | 9 | Violet | EXINT* | External interrupt |

NOTES:

- Active low signals are suffixed with a "*"
- Since most signals are shared with both drive 1 and drive 2, the logic in each drive uses the ENABLE* signal to activate appropriately.
  - Pin 14 for Disk II drive 1 and drive 2 have separate enable signals (14a and 14b)
  - Pin 17 for Uni/Duo Disk is chained to first drive (drive 1) and second drive (drive 2) is enabled via other logic in the first drive.
- The EXTINT* signal is not present on the Disk II controller card. In the Apple //c computer, it is routed to the DSR* signal of the internal 6551 ACIA (UART) chip.

== See also ==
- List of Apple drives
