= Retrospect (software) =

Data backup software for the SME market

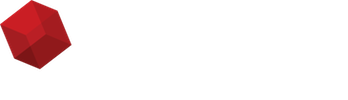
- Developer(s): Dantz Development Corporation
- Initial release: 1989
- Operating system: macOS, Linux, Microsoft Windows
- Type: Backup
- License: Proprietary
- Website: www.retrospect.com

Retrospect is a family of software applications that back up computers running the macOS, Microsoft Windows, and Linux (and until 2019 classic Mac OS) operating systems. It uses the client–server backup model.

The product is focused on the small and medium enterprise (SME) market. It performs three types of backup: "A Recycle backup deletes a backup set and adds all files, and a New Media backup creates a new backup set, copying all the files not included. Again this represents all files. Once installed, scripts can also be introduced to enable Scheduled backup using predetermined information supplied by the administrator. This information contains source, destination and other criteria, which enables a backup session to scan and back up one volume at a time, requiring less memory than an immediate backup."

The product is used for GUI-scripted backup.

== History ==
The software was first developed by Dantz Development Corporation in 1989, initially for the Macintosh platform and continuing later for Windows. With sales split evenly between the two variants and the Macintosh variant claiming 90% of its market, Dantz Development Corporation was acquired by EMC Corporation in 2004. In 2006 version 7.5, the refined first release of the Windows variant under EMC, added performance features needed by SMEs.

Acquisition by EMC, under its Insignia brand, led to the product being briefly mothballed when Insignia was shut down in 2007. It was revived in 2008 and transferred to EMC's new acquisition Iomega. A "premature" release of Retrospect 8 in 2009 undermined its market after Apple introduced its competing Time Machine in late 2007. In 2010, Retrospect was sold to Roxio, owned by Sonic Solutions, which was then in turn acquired by Rovi. Rovi decided that it was not a core business, but a team who had worked on the product approached Rovi with the idea of spinning out as a separate company. Retrospect, Inc. was formed by a core team most of whom had worked on the product for ten years or more. Retrospect 9 was introduced in 2012, to positive reviews.

In June 2019 the holding company StorCentric—which also owns Drobo—announced that it had acquired Retrospect Inc., which it will operate as an wholly owned independent subsidiary.

After the 2023 bankruptcy of StorCentric, Retrospect was spun off into a separate company owned by Serene Investment Management, a private equity company which had a financial link to StorCentric.

== See also ==
- Apple Tape Backup 40SC
