= Hard Disk 20SC =

Hard drive by Apple

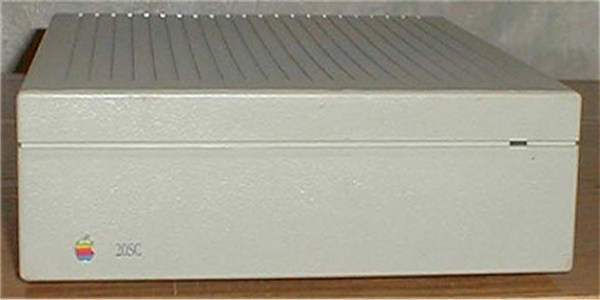
- Model number: M2604
- Connects to: Macintosh Plus; Macintosh SE; Macintosh II via: Direct Connection; Apple IIe; Apple IIGS via: Apple IIGS
- Design firm: Apple Inc.
- Manufacturer: Apple Inc.
- Introduced: September 1986
- Discontinued: 1989
- Cost: US$1,299 (equivalent to $3,820 in 2025)
- Type: Hard Disk
- Memory: 20 MB
- Connection: Direct
- Ports: 50-pin SCSI x2
- Power consumption: 60 W
- Weight: 8 lb (3.6 kg)
- Dimensions: 3.1 x 9.7 x 10.5 (inches); 78 x 246 x 266 (mm)

The Apple Hard Disk 20SC is Apple's first SCSI based hard drive for the Apple II family as well as the Macintosh and other third party computers using an industry standard SCSI interface.

== History ==
Released in September 1986 along with the Apple IIGS (which requires an optional SCSI interface card to use it), it debuted over 9 months after the introduction of the Macintosh Plus, the first to include Apple's SCSI interface. It was a welcome addition, delivering considerably faster data transfer rates (up to 1.25 megabytes per second) than its predecessors, the Hard Disk 20 (62.5 Kilobytes per second) and ProFile.

== Hardware ==
The 20SC originally contained a half height 5.25" Seagate ST-225N 20MB SCSI hard drive, but was later manufactured with a full-height 3.5" MiniScribe 8425SA 20MB SCSI hard drive (The full-height 3.5" drive bay form factor is the same height as the half-height 5.25" form factor). The latter drive is the same size as the drive inside the Macintosh Hard Disk 20, but much larger storage capacity than the 5-10 MB that had previously been offered by Apple for the II family. The same drive mechanism would also be offered 6 months later as a built-in drive option on the Macintosh II and SE. The 20SC has two standard Centronics 50-pin connectors, one for the computer and one for daisy-chaining additional SCSI devices, and a SCSI ID selection switch. An external terminator is required if it is the only SCSI device connected. The case itself can accommodate up to a 5.25" full-height hard drive mechanism. The case design would be reused unchanged (in Platinum only) for 3 more models introduced the following year: 40SC, 80SC & 160SC (the numbers indicating the storage capacity in megabytes). While the transfer rates are significantly higher than older Apple hard drives due to the faster SCSI bus technology, the actual transfer rate varies from computer to computer thanks to different SCSI implementation based on developing industry standards.

== Reference ==
P/N : 825-1388-A seems being related to internal half height 5.25" Seagate ST-225N 20MB SCSI hard drive

P/N : 825-1339-B seems being related to internal full-height 3.5" MiniScribe 8425SA 20MB SCSI hard drive

Both assembled in Ireland.

== Design ==
In addition to being the first cross-platform drive offered by Apple it is the first hard drive to use the Snow White design language. It is the only Snow White product to use the Macintosh beige color and one of the few Apple products to be introduced in two different colors at the same time. Since the Apple IIGS was the first Apple product to debut in the new "Platinum" gray color, the 20SC was sold in that color and the beige color of the Macintosh Plus, which the 20SC is designed to sit perfectly beneath. In 1987, all Apple products changed to Platinum, which would remain in use for the next 10 years.

== See also ==
- List of Apple drives
