= Apple FileWare =

Floppy drive by Apple

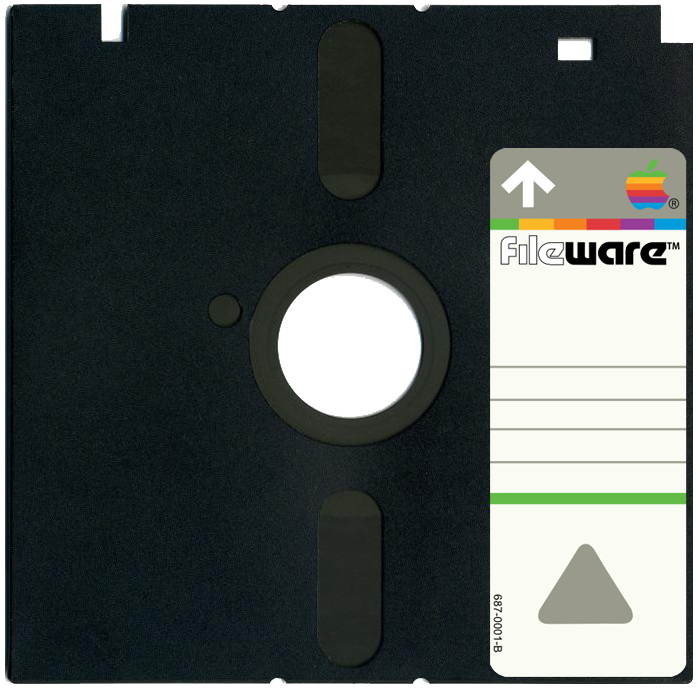
Fileware diskette

FileWare floppy disk drives and diskettes were designed by Apple Computer as a higher-performance alternative to the Disk II and Disk III floppy systems used on the Apple II and Apple III personal computers, though it only ended up being used in the original Apple Lisa. The drive is named Apple 871 in service documentation, based on its approximate formatted storage capacity in kilobytes, but is most commonly known by its codename Twiggy, named for a famously thin 1960s fashion model.

== History ==
In 1978, Apple intended to develop its own FileWare drive mechanism for the new Apple III and Lisa business computers being developed. They quickly ran into difficulties which precluded them from the Apple III, which continued to use the earlier Shugart design. Finally, FileWare drives were implemented in the Lisa, released on January 19, 1983. The original Macintosh was originally intended to have a Shugart drive, then a FileWare drive, then eventually shipped with Sony's 3.5" 400k diskette drive. Although Apple planned to make FileWare drives available for the Apple II and Apple III, and announced them under the names UniFile and DuoFile (for single and dual drives, respectively), these products were never shipped.

== Drive ==
FileWare drive is 5¼-inch double-sided, but not compatible with industry-standard diskettes. In a single-sided floppy drive, the disk head is opposed by a foam pressure pad. In a normal double-sided floppy disk drive, the top and bottom heads are almost directly opposed. Apple was concerned about head wear, and instead designed the FileWare drive so the top and bottom heads are on opposite sides of the spindle, and each is opposed by a pressure pad. Because there is only one actuator to move the heads, when one head is near the spindle, the other is near the outer rim of the disk.

The drive is approximately the same size as a standard full-height 5¼ inch floppy drive, but does not use the standard mounting hole locations. The electrical interface is completely different from that of standard drives, though conceptually similar to that of the Disk II.

== Diskette ==
The FileWare diskette has the same overall jacket dimensions of a normal 5¼ inch diskette, but because of the head arrangement, the jacket has non-standard cutouts for the heads, with two sets of cutouts on opposite sides of the spindle hole. The write enable sensor is also in a non-standard location, though most FileWare diskettes were produced without a write protect slot. The jacket has a corner cutout that keys the diskette to prevent insertion in an incorrect orientation, and a rectangular hole that the drive uses to latch the diskette in place, preventing removal until the software allows it.

FileWare drives use 62.5 tracks per inch rather than the standard 48 or 96 TPI, and use high flux density (comparable to the later IBM 1.2MB format introduced with the PC/AT). This requires custom high-density media. The coercivity required is similar to that of the 1.2MB format, so it is possible to modify the jacket of 1.2MB diskettes for use in a FileWare drive.

== Format ==
The disk format uses group coded recording (GCR) in a manner very similar to that of the Disk II. The drive contains circuitry to allow software control over the motor speed, which is used to maintain near constant flux transition rate on all tracks, so that more data can be stored on the outer tracks.

Each physical sector stores 512 data bytes and 12 tag bytes. Each side of the disk had 46 tracks, and the number of sectors per track varies from 15 to 22. This results in 851 sectors per side, or a total capacity of 871,424 bytes. The Lisa Hardware Manual doesn't explicitly state the total number of sectors, but page 173 states that there are 4 tracks of 22 sectors, 7x21, 6x20, 6x19, 6x18, 6x17, 7x16, and 4x15. The controller uses similar circuitry to the Disk II controller, but runs at twice the clock rate. The controller uses a dedicated MOS 6504 microprocessor; in the Lisa this is on the system I/O card, and for the UniFile/DuoFile products, it is on an interface card that plugs into a peripheral expansion slot. The Lisa 2/10 and Macintosh XL I/O card use the IWM controller chip to replace the TTL chips of the earlier design.

== Reliability ==
FileWare drives proved to be somewhat unreliable. In early 1984, Apple introduced the Lisa 2, which uses a single 3½ inch Sony floppy drive in place of the two FileWare drives of the original Lisa. A free upgrade was offered to Lisa 1 owners.
