= Xserve RAID =

Apple Fibre Channel storage enclosure

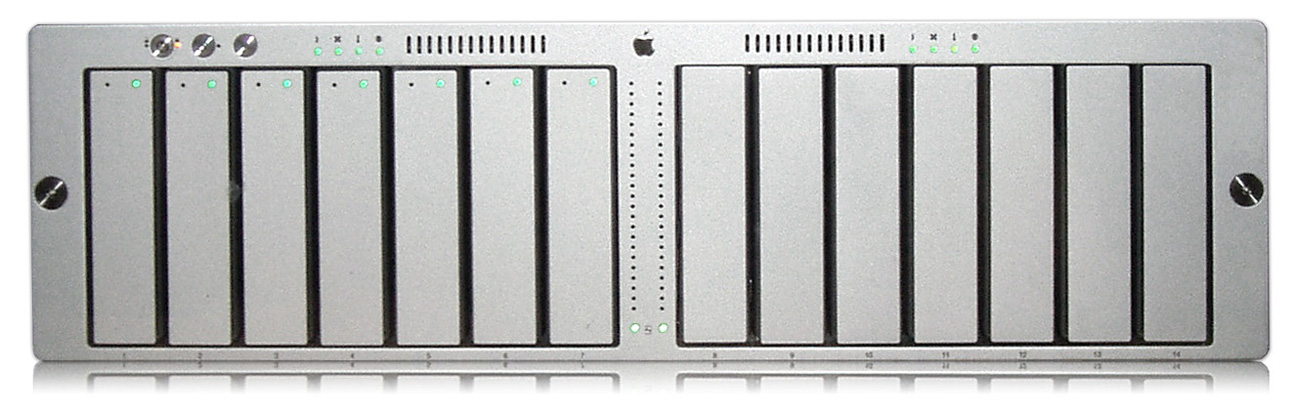
Xserve RAID

Xserve RAID is a attachment mass-storage server that was offered by Apple Inc.

Xserve RAID held up to 14 hot-swappable Ultra-ATA hard drives, and had a capacity of 10.5 TB when filled with 750 GB modules. Xserve RAID supported RAID levels of 0, 0+1, 1, 3 and 5 in hardware, hybrid RAID levels such as 10 and 50 could be created in software. It was rack-mountable and was 3U high.

Although the Xserve RAID contained 14 drives, they were split into two independent groups of 7 drives each managed by an identical RAID controller. Importantly, the controllers were independent, but not redundant; each managed seven of the storage array's fourteen drives, given a failure of one of the controllers those 7 drives were not accessible: the other could not take over its duties. Xserve RAID did, however, have redundant cooling units and power supplies. Xserve RAID's ports were two Fibre Channel ports for regular data transfer, a 10/100 Ethernet port for remote management, and a serial port for UPS communication via the Simple Signaling Protocol.

Apple marketed Xserve RAID mainly as a companion to Xserve in file server and high-performance technical computing applications. The storage array is also useful in some environments such as non-linear video editing. Also, Apple certified Xserve RAID for use with some other vendors' servers, such as those running Windows Server 2003 or Red Hat Enterprise Linux. Due to the cross-platform support available, users do not need a Mac to administer the Xserve RAID. Apple shipped a CD-ROM with the device containing the Xserve RAID Admin Tools, a Java software application that runs on most operating systems — including OS X, Windows, Linux, and Solaris.

Xserve RAID was available in models costing between US$5,999 and US$10,999 (later US$12,999), plus configuration and support options.

The Xserve RAID was discontinued on February 19, 2008.

== History ==
- Xserve RAID
  - Build: Feb 2003 - Jan 2004
  - Part numbers: M8668, M8669, M8670
  - Dual independent RAID controllers each with:
    - One HSSDC2 Fibre Channel Port
    - One DB-9 serial port for UPS systems
    - One 10/100BASE-T Ethernet interfaces for remote management
  - 14 independent ATA100 Apple drive module channels/bays
  - 180 GB PATA supported
- Xserve RAID (SFP)
  - Build: Jan 2004 - Oct 2004
  - Part numbers: M9721, MA208
  - Dual independent RAID controllers each with:
    - One 2 Gb Fibre Channel SFP port with 200 MB/s throughput
    - One DB-9 serial port for UPS systems
    - One 10/100BASE-T Ethernet interfaces for remote management
  - 14 independent ATA100 Apple drive module channels/bays
  - 180 GB, 250 GB PATA support added on firmware 1.2.6
- Xserve RAID (SFP Late 2004)
  - Build: Oct 2004 - Feb 2008
  - Part numbers: A1009
  - Dual independent RAID controllers each with:
    - One 2 Gb Fibre Channel SFP port with 200 MB/s throughput
    - One DB-9 serial port for UPS systems
    - One 10/100BASE-T Ethernet interfaces for remote management
  - 14 independent 100 MB/s ATA100 Apple drive module channels/bays
  - 180 GB, 250 GB, 400 GB and 500 GB support added on firmware 1.5, 750 GB and 1 TB PATA support added on firmware 1.5.1
- Line discontinued: February 19, 2008
