= Hard Disk 20 =

First Macintosh hard drive developed by Apple

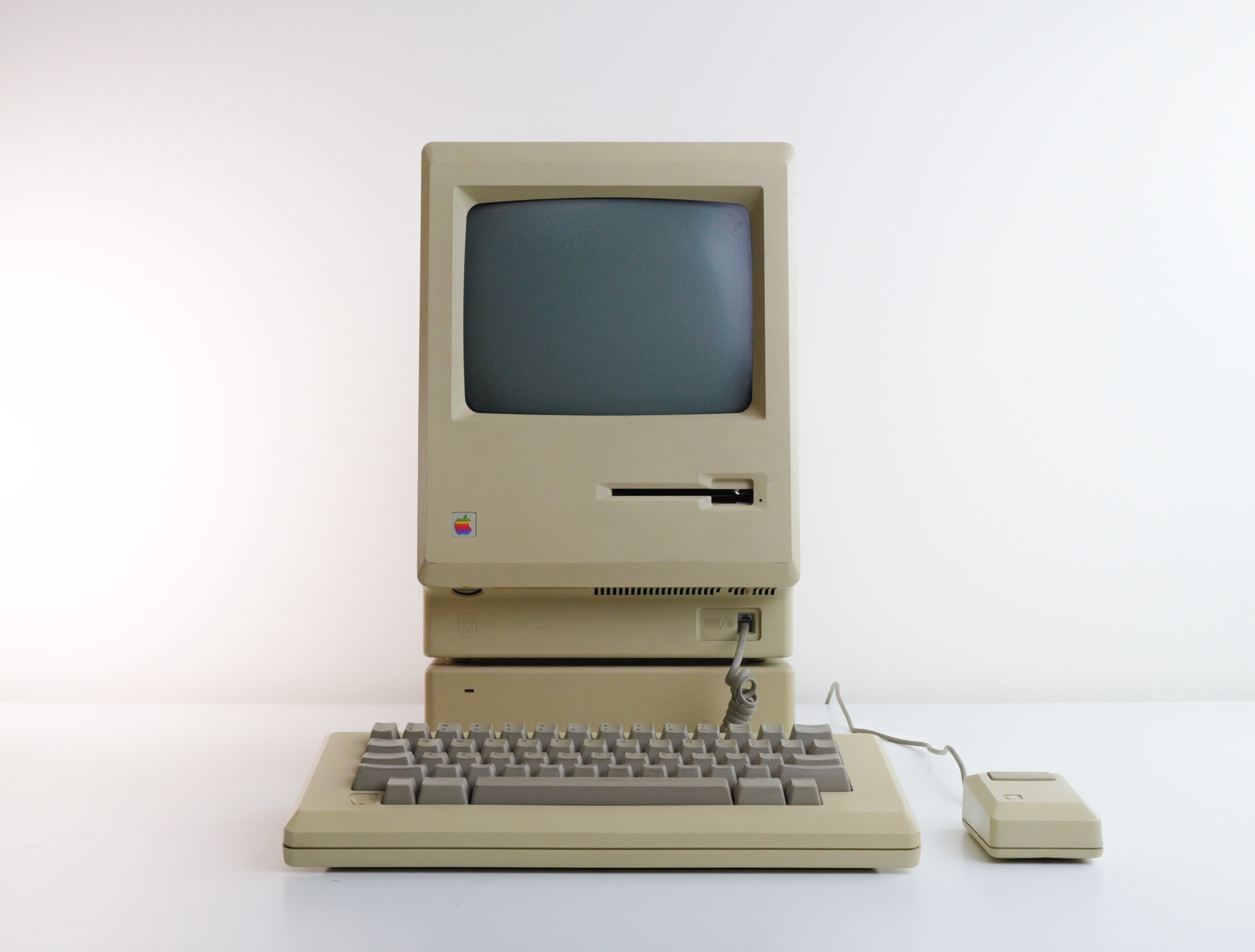
- A Hard Disk 20 under a Macintosh 512Ke
- Manufacturer: Apple Computer
- Introduced: September 17, 1985
- Discontinued: September 1987
- Cost: US$1,495 (equivalent to $4,475 in 2025)
- Type: Hard disk drive
- Memory: 20 MB
- Connection: DB-19 floppy port @ 500 kbit/s
- Power consumption: 30 W
- Weight: 7 lb (3.2 kg)
- Dimensions: 3.1 × 9.7 × 10.5 in (7.9 × 24.6 × 26.7 cm)

The Macintosh Hard Disk 20 is the first hard disk drive developed by Apple Computer specifically for use with the Macintosh 512K. Introduced on September 17, 1985, it was part of Apple's solution toward completing the Macintosh Office (a suite of integrated business hardware & software) announced in January 1985. It would be over a year more before Apple would release the file server software AppleShare that would link all of the hardware together. By that time the SCSI interface introduced on the Macintosh Plus in January 1986, would accommodate far faster and more efficient hard drives, rendering the Hard Disk 20 virtually obsolete.

== Features ==
The Hard Disk 20 (or HD20, as it was known colloquially) contains a 20 MB 3.5" Rodime hard disk which provides over 50 times the data storage of the stock 400 kB disk drive. At the time when the average file size was around 10-20 kB and due to the vast number of those files the HD20 can contain, Apple's original Macintosh File System, which does not allow for directories, made organizing those files unwieldy. Therefore, Apple introduced it with a new System and Finder update which include the Hierarchical File System allowing the user to better organize files on such a large volume. As a result, only the Macintosh 512K can access it; the original Macintosh 128K does not have enough RAM to load the new file system. While the Macintosh 512K can use the drive, it cannot use it as a startup disk; it requires an additional file in the System Folder on a floppy disk known as the Hard Disk 20 Startup disk which adds additional code into memory during startup. A startup routine also allows the Mac to check for the presence of a System file on the Hard Disk, switch over to it and eject the startup disk. The HD20 cannot be used as a startup disk directly without first loading the code from the floppy disk drive. With the release of the Macintosh Plus and the Macintosh 512Ke, both containing the upgraded 128 kB ROM which contains the additional code, the HD20 can be used alone as a startup disk.

While other hard drives were available on the market, Apple's HD20 was generally preferred because it uses the high-speed floppy disk port, whereas third-party drives use the lower-speed Serial Port. While the floppy port was not initially supposed to be used this way, making creative use of the port allows the HD20 to achieve much higher transfer rates than products limited to the serial ports. With few exceptions, this along with complete compatibility with the new Hierarchical File System, gave Apple an instant edge over the competition. In addition, the HD20 saves desk space. It fits underneath the computer in same footprint, elevating it 3 inches.

HD20 is also compatible with Macintosh SE, but not Macintosh SE/30 despite the latter's external drive port, because SE/30's ROM does not support the hard drive.

=== Specifications ===
- Recording Surfaces: 2
- Per Drive: 20.7 MB (formatted)
- No. of Cylinders: 610
- Total No. of Tracks: 1220
- No. of Sector/Track: 32
- Bytes/Sector: 532 (formatted)
- Total No. of Blocks (Data): 38,964
- Spare Blocks: 76
- Access Time: Track to Track 10 ms; Average 50 ms; Maximum 150 ms; Average Latency 10.9 ms
- Rotational Speed: the drive has a rotational speed of 45.73 rotations/second (2744 rpm) and access time of 85 ms.

== History ==
In 1985, the HD20 was an important step to solidifying the Macintosh as a true business computer and it was eagerly anticipated following its April announcement. Until Apple's introduction a year later of the Hard Disk 20SC, the first SCSI drive they manufactured, the HD20 was the only Apple-manufactured hard drive available for any Macintosh except the Macintosh XL. The HD20 was not compatible with any other Apple computer or other platforms.

However, the HD20's unique design and position in the marketplace was quickly outmoded by the advancement of the significantly faster SCSI standard which debuted with the Macintosh Plus in January 1986. Some third party companies offered a SCSI conversion kit which replaced the controller board thus preserving the user's investment in the expensive but proprietary Rodime drive. Apple officially dropped support for the HD20 with System 6 as well as omitting the necessary ROM code beginning with the Macintosh II. Sales of the HD20 continued to support the Macintosh 512Ke which has no other hard drive options, until it was discontinued in late 1987. Apple dropped support for the HD20 in all of its newer Macs, only to find many business users upgrading their older systems needed a way to transfer data from the unsupported drives to the newer Macs. Only Macs with legacy technology and floppy disk ports, which were eliminated entirely from Macintosh computers in 1991, are able to continue to use the older slower technology.

Manufactured in significant numbers for almost two years, the HD20 remains as one of the few surviving hard drives usable by a stock Macintosh 512K or 512Ke.

== See also ==
- List of Apple drives
