= Integrated Woz Machine =

Single-chip version of the floppy disk controller for the Apple II

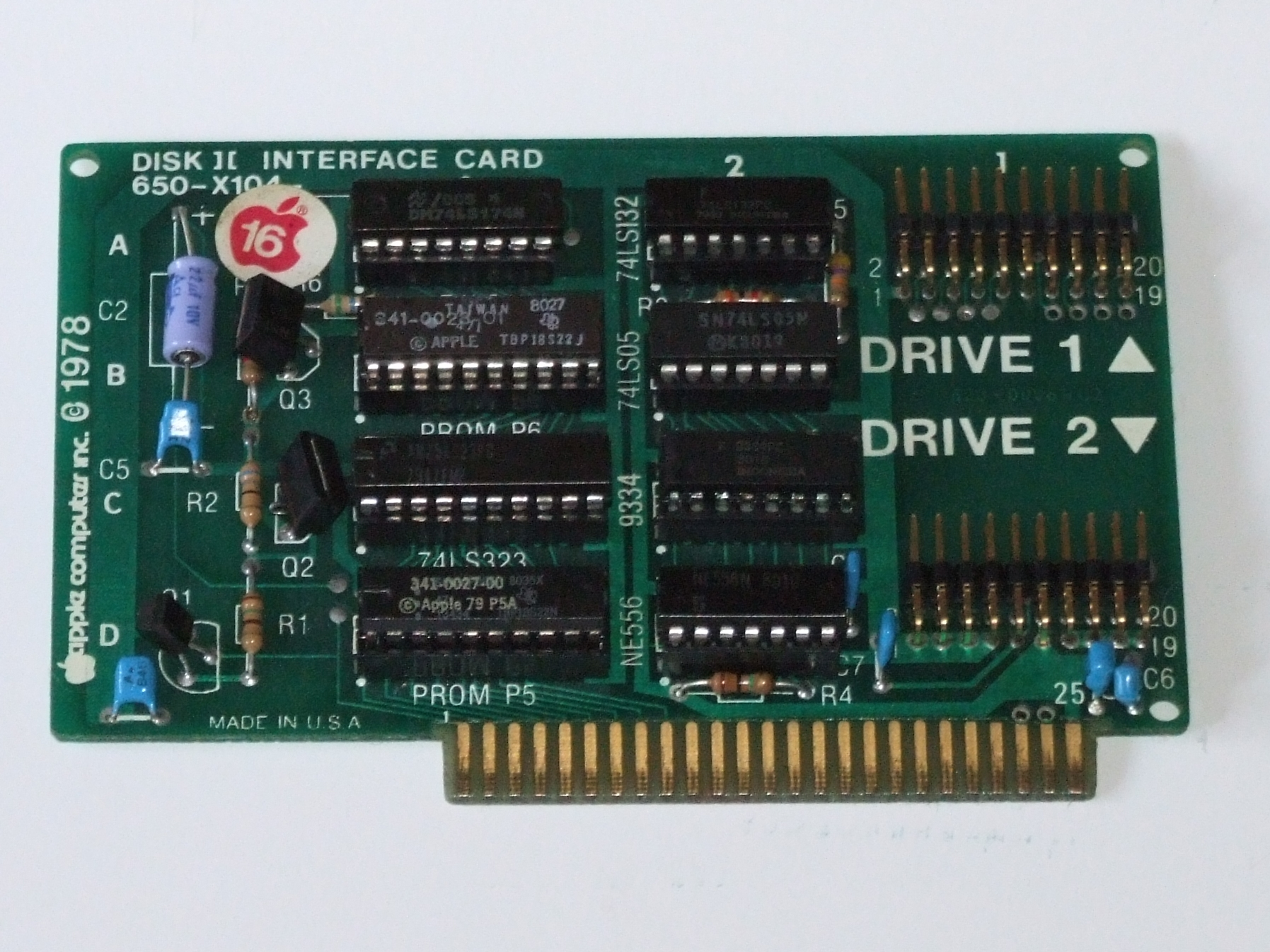
Original disk II controller. Integrated Woz Machine implemented all their logic on a single chip.

The Integrated Woz Machine (or IWM for short) is a single-chip version of the floppy disk controller for the Apple II. It was also employed in Macintosh computers.

== History ==
When developing a floppy drive for the Apple II, Apple Inc. co-founder Steve Wozniak felt that the existing models available on the market were too complicated, expensive and inefficient. Rather than use the existing floppy drives from Shugart Associates, Wozniak decided to use the drive mechanism – but develop his own electronics separately for the both drive and the controller.

Wozniak successfully came up with a working floppy drive with a greatly reduced number of electronic components. Instead of storing 8–10 sectors (each holding 256 bytes of data) per track on a 5.25-inch floppy disk — something standard at that time, Wozniak utilized group-coded recording (GCR), and with 5-and-3 encoding he managed to squeeze as many as 13 sectors on each track using the same mechanics and the same storage medium. In a later revision, this number was bumped up to 16 sectors per track with 6-and-2 encoding.

The floppy drive controller board, the "Disk II interface," was built with 8 chips, one of which is the PROM, containing tables for the encoder and decoder, the state machine, and some code.

== Application and updates ==
To make it easier to place the controller on the main board, Wendell Sander integrated all these components into one single chip—the IWM.

The IWM is essentially a disk controller on one IC. It was employed in the Apple IIc, and later Apple IIGS, the Apple Lisa 2/10, and all Mac models up to the Macintosh II. Later, an extended version, known as SWIM (Sander-Wozniak Integrated Machine), was introduced. This new version added the capability of reading and writing FM- and MFM-formatted (PC-formatted) floppy disks. In later Mac models, more and more peripheral components were added to the SWIM, until Apple finally phased out floppy drives from the Macs. The floppy controller function stayed in the chipset for a while thereafter, even though the provision of floppy drives for Macs had already ceased. For instance, the first iMacs still had a floppy drive connector on its motherboard, allowing a floppy drive to be retrofitted by knowledgeable enthusiasts.

== See also ==
- Paula (Commodore Amiga)
