= Deluxe Music Construction Set =

1986 music composition software

- Macintosh version
- Original author: Geoff Brown
- Developer: Electronic Arts
- Release: 1986; 40 years ago
- Platform: Amiga, Mac
- Type: Music composition

User interface on Macintosh System 6

Deluxe Music Construction Set (DMCS) is a 1986 music composition, musical notation, and playback package for the Amiga and Macintosh. The program was originally released as Will Harvey's Music Construction Set for the Apple II and other computers, but was redesigned (and the Will Harvey name dropped) for the deluxe version. DMCS was created by Geoff Brown and published by Electronic Arts (EA). Ariolasoft published the program in Europe under license from EA.

== Summary ==
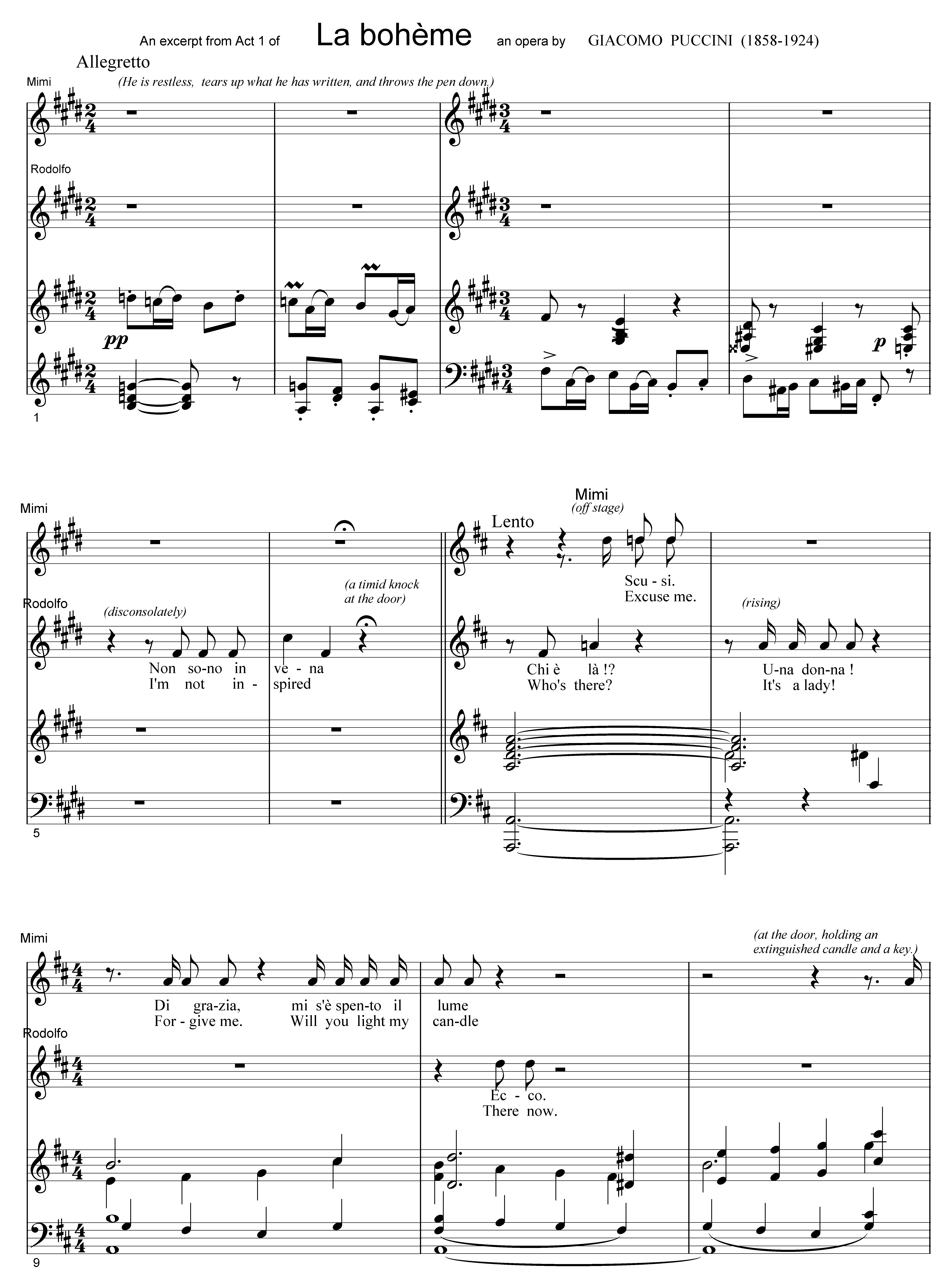
First page of Puccini's opera La Boheme, engraved in Deluxe Music Construction Set, printed to EPS, converted to PDF and then PNG

DMCS was the first of a line of music programs for the Amiga to make use of its four voice 8-bit sample playback and MIDI synthesis. DMCS is more advanced than the first music application that EA made for the Commodore 64, Apple II, Atari 8-bit computers, and Atari ST, Music Construction Set. For example, it allows users to enter lyrics in with the musical score, though the lyrics are strictly for the user's benefit. Bach's Fugue in G minor "Little" is included as a sample score.

DMCS was originally released for the Mac.

== Unreleased port ==
In 1986, a port by Randel B. Reiss for the Apple IIGS was written, which uses the built-in Ensoniq wavetable sample-based synthesizer. Screen shots appeared in various catalogues and was scheduled for a fall of 1987 release. The port was never publicly released, but its music engine was used for producing the soundtrack for the Apple IIGS game titles Zany Golf and The Immortal, both of which were written by Will Harvey.

== Reception ==
After testing a beta of the Amiga version, Info stated that Deluxe Music "offers the most accurate standard music notation display and editing features I've ever seen ... it is a flexible, detailed composition program".

Reviewing Version 2.0 in The Musical Times, Michael Fowler wrote "The result depends very much on the operator, who needs to have extensive knowledge of engraving to make publication quality output." He also considered that the slurs, spacing, stems, and beaming were "less than satisfactory", and that the difficulty in producing page formats and layouts make it more for the amateur than the professional."

== See also ==
- Aegis Sonix
