= IMVU =

Online 3D social platform

- Type: Private
- Industry: Social network
- Founded: 2004; 22 years ago
- Founder: Will Harvey, Eric Ries
- Headquarters: Redwood City, California, U.S.
- Key people: Daren Tsui (CEO)
- Website: www.imvu.com

IMVU (/ˈɪmvjuː/, stylized as imvu) is an online virtual world and social networking site.

== History ==
IMVU was founded in 2004 and was originally backed by venture investors Menlo Ventures, AllegisCyber Capital, Justin Greene, Bridgescale Partners, and Best Buy Capital.

IMVU members use 3D avatars to meet new people, chat, create, and play games. In 2014, IMVU had approximately six million active players, and had the largest virtual goods catalog of more than 6 million items as of 2011. The business was previously located in Mountain View, California.

In March 2020, IMVU introduced Live Rooms, a feature enabling users to host live events such as fashion shows, lectures, talk shows, and virtual weddings, allowing audience interaction and tipping.

In 2022, IMVU partnered with Spectrum Labs to use artificial intelligence that identifies and rewards healthy behavior in online interactions.

== Name ==
The company name was neither an acronym nor an initialism. IMVU co-founder Eric Ries described the accidental process by which the company acquired its meaningless name, and stated "It's not an acronym; it doesn't stand for anything".

IMVU's official account had used the backronym "Instant Messenger Virtual Universe" in some on-platform forum posts before 2009, but it has since been stated by the same account that this was intended to "never [be] an official thing", and the words were never used in any branding. The full phrase was also never included in any trademarks, which only cover the letters "imvu".

== Credits ==
IMVU operates a virtual economy based on its proprietary digital currency known as credits, which users can purchase with real money or obtain through various in-platform activities. Credits are used to buy virtual goods such as clothing, furniture, and accessories created by other users for their 3D avatars.

The platform also supports a creator-driven marketplace, where designers sell digital items and earn credits that can be converted to real-world value through IMVU’s reseller program. In 2021, IMVU partnered with the digital finance platform Uphold to allow users to convert their in-platform currency, VCOIN, into real-world money. VCOIN is a blockchain-based digital currency and the first of its kind to receive a no-action letter from the U.S. Securities and Exchange Commission, providing it with regulatory clarity.

== See also ==
- Metaverse
- Second Life
- SAPARi
- PlayStation Home
- OLIVE
- Active Worlds
- There
