= Ultimate Soundtracker =

Music tracker for the Amiga

- Original author: Karsten Obarski
- Release: 1987; 39 years ago
- Stable release: 2.6 / 1992; 34 years ago
- Operating system: AmigaOS
- Platform: Amiga
- Type: Tracker (music software)
- License: Commercial

The Ultimate Soundtracker, or simply Soundtracker, is a commercial music tracker program for the Amiga created by Karsten Obarski, a German software developer and composer. It is the first music tracker, and the pioneer of its software category.

== History ==
Soundtracker started as a tool for game sound development for the Amiga. The program allowed for four-channel hardware mixing on all Amiga computers, but unlike subsequent versions, limited the number of samples/instruments in a song to 15. It could export the tracks as a sequence of assembly instructions, and later introduced its own MOD file format. A disk of instrument samples (ST-01) was distributed together with the program.

The Ultimate Soundtracker.

Soundtracker was released as a commercial product in December 1987. It did not enjoy success as a general music composition software, with reviews calling it "illogical", "difficult" and "temperamental"; it was eclipsed in that market by programs such as Aegis Sonix and Deluxe Music Construction Set.

However, the interface that The Ultimate Soundtracker pioneered became a standard for game sound production on the Amiga. Despite the original version's issues some computer enthusiasts saw its good ideas; the original code of Ultimate Soundtracker was quickly disassembled, and illicitly improved, with no consideration to Obarski's intellectual property. Soundtracker II were released by the scene group The Jungle Command, followed by a plethora of further illicit versions, by multiple different scene groups, with countless improvements compared to the official and legal commercial version. The modified versions of the program were spread across the burgeoning Amiga warez scene.

In November 1988 Obarski released the last official release, The Ultimate Soundtracker 2. While much improved over his previous official release, it was outcompeted by the collective work of the scene groups, which at the end of 1988 had far surpassed the capabilities of the official commercial version.

In 1989, the program was further improved upon by two Swedish programmers, Pex "Mahoney" Tufvesson and Anders "Kaktus" Berkeman, who released a version known as NoiseTracker. Some versions turned out to be incompatible with the Amiga OS 2.0, causing crashes. Protracker was another successor, released in 1991, which solved the stability problems and made several changes to the user interface.

== See also ==
- Chiptune
- List of audio trackers

== General references ==
- Collins, Karen (2008), Game sound: an introduction to the history, theory, and practice of video game music and sound design, MIT Press, p. 58, ISBN 978-0-262-03378-7
- Collins, Karen (June 2007), MIDI and MOD format (PDF), gamessound.com, archived from the original on 2009-08-06
- Wright, Mark (March 1998), Retrospective - Karsten Obarski, textfiles.com
