= Bank Street Writer =

Word processing software

- Release: 1981; 45 years ago
- Platform: Apple II, Atari 8-bit, Commodore 64, MSX, Classic Mac OS, IBM PC, PCjr
- Type: Word processor

Bank Street Writer is a word processor for the Apple II, Atari 8-bit computers, Commodore 64, MSX, Mac, IBM PC, and PCjr computers. It was designed in 1981 by a team of educators at the Bank Street College of Education in New York City, software developer Franklin E. Smith, and programmers at Intentional Educations in Watertown, Massachusetts. The software was sold in two versions: one for elementary school students published by Scholastic and a general version from Broderbund.

== History ==
The most popular word processor for the Apple II personal computer was Apple Writer, which (prior to the version II release) operated in Apple's text mode where all text consisted of uppercase letters. Apple Writer used a black-on-white character to represent a capital letter, while normal white-on-black characters indicated lower case. Microcomputer word processors of the early 1980s typically had no menus; so to perform basic functions such as copying and pasting, a writer had to type a series of keystrokes.

Bank Street Writer was initially designed for use in schools. The name was a modern-day reference to the Bank Street Readers, a widely respected early learning book series created in the 1960s by Bank Street College. The school version of Bank Street Writer was published by Scholastic Inc. and included a series of workbooks and other teacher and student materials. Bank Street Writer became the leading word processor used in elementary schools throughout most of the 1980s. During this period, Bank Street College, led by its president, Richard Ruopp, did pioneering work in the use of technology in elementary schools. Among the results were Bank Street Writer and The Voyage of the Mimi, a groundbreaking science-based TV series.

Bank Street Writer operated in graphics mode, where characters were displayed normally with lower and upper case letters, and it provided helpful prompts during editing. The interface contains menus listing the operations the word processor can perform, such as "cut" and "paste", and brief directions for how to perform each function. The design addressed the need for a word processor that would enable elementary school children to use a computer to write stories and essays. Bank Street Writer is a modal editor - pressing the Esc key toggled between editing mode and menu mode.

Broderbund published a successful home version of Bank Street Writer, which did not contain the additional school materials and was published as a retail software product. Bank Street Writer was for several years the best-selling product in the "home software" category on what was then the most respected sales chart in the industry - the Softsel Hot List, from Softsel Distributing of Inglewood, California.

Bank Street Writer Plus enhances the original word processor, with support for 80 column-width display, dropdown menus, macros, function keys, spellcheck, and thesaurus.

== Reception ==
II Computing listed Bank Street Writer eighth on the magazine's list of top Apple II non-game, non-educational software as of late 1985, based on sales and market-share data.

At its introduction, the program was the subject of a laudatory story in Time about how the Bank Street Writer ("BSW") was introducing word processing into the classroom. From the article: "Children who once struggled to write two-page stories are churning out five pages or more." and "Most important, the children cheerfully tackle the messy business of revision." The article concluded: "Judging from recent sales, however, a good proportion of BSW users are adults. Designing a program for children, the Bank Street team inadvertently responded to a challenge the entire software industry faces: making computers accessible to people who do not understand machines and do not want to read manuals."

"Bank Street Writer was designed to embody the word simplicity, and it does so quite admirably", John J. Anderson wrote in Creative Computing, adding that "it is quite capable of producing professional results with any short document ... I cannot think of any features I would demand from a $70 word processor that are missing". He wished that other software had a tutorial like Bank Street's, and said that "to the student, housewife, and John Q. Public ... Bank Street Writer is the leader of the pack". ANALOG Computing stated that Bank Street Writer was suited for home users wanting to write letters and school reports, albeit lacking footnotes. The author criticized the slow speed of the word processor for documents of three or more pages, reporting that he gave up on using it to write the review, but concluded that "in spite of its shortcomings, BSW is the easiest word processor program" for Atari 8-bit computers and that it "has almost everything going for it—it is up to the user to decide if it goes far enough". Antic wrote, "The Bank Street Writer was designed for use at home by the family, and for those whose writing needs are on a small scale. This is a really good first word processor - for someone new to the Atari." Byte said that it was "a good word processor, but it has limited uses". While approving of its ease of use, the magazine criticized its 38x18 screen as "simply too small to display any but the simplest documents". InfoWorld's reviewer praised its ease of use, stating that he used the review copy for two hours before opening the manual. PC Magazine criticized BSW's user friendly approach of only offering one way to access functionality as limiting for more experienced users, saying there should be a way to bypass the menus.

Compute! said in 1987 of the updated version, "There will probably never be a perfect word processor ... but Bank Street Writer Plus brings us a little closer to the unattainable". PC in 1988 liked Plus's faster speed. While stating that it was not suitable for businesses or advanced writers, the magazine concluded that Plus "is a logical choice for beginners, especially for families".

== See also ==
- Bank Street Music Writer
