= Apple II sound cards =

Throughout its lengthy, multi-model lifespan, the Apple II series computers lacked any serious built-in sound capabilities. At the time of its release in 1977, this did not distinguish it from its contemporaries (ex. the TRS-80 and Commodore PET), but by 1982, it shared the market with several sound-equipped competitors such as the Commodore 64, whose SID chip could produce sophisticated multi-timbral music and sound effects.

All Apple II models (except the Apple IIGS, a significantly different, albeit backwards-compatible machine) possess a speaker, but it was limited to 1-bit output in the form of a simple voltage the user could switch on and off with software, creating clicks from the speaker each time the state was toggled. By turning the signal on and off rapidly, sounds with pitches could be produced.

This approach places extreme constraints on software design, since it requires the CPU to be available to toggle the output at specific frequencies, and all other code must be structured around that requirement. If sound generation code didn't execute at precisely the right intervals, generating specific output frequencies would be impossible.

Sound hardware in competing computers consisted of extra chips that generated sounds without continuous CPU involvement, freeing up the CPU for normal code execution. The various third-party add-on devices listed here provide this same capability to the Apple II.

== Music ==
=== Music Cards ===
Music cards consist primarily of circuit boards plugged into the expansion slots of the Apple computer. There is generally no method to directly play the cards as a musical instrument. Instead, music is programmed into the computer, typically using the computer's keyboard and pointing devices (such as the Apple's game controls or using an add-on light pen). The computer then plays the music back using the music cards to produce the sound, generally through a standard audio system.

==== ALF Music Card MC16 ====
The first hardware music accessory for the Apple II was ALF's "Apple Music Synthesizer", later renamed "Music Card MC16". It was demonstrated late in 1978 and began shipping in volume June 1979. It featured graphical music entry, a first for any personal computer. Each card produced three voices, and two or three cards could be used for six or nine voices.

==== ALF Music Card MC1 ====
Using much the same software as the ALF Music Card MC16, ALF introduced a new hardware design as the "Apple Music II", later renamed "Music Card MC1". It had nine voices on a single card, although the range, tuning accuracy, and envelope/volume control was reduced compared to the Music Card MC16. The card used three TI SN76489N chips.

==== American Micro Products Juke Box Synthesizer ====
Advertised for sale in June 1980, this card featured three simultaneous voices with a five octave range and one white noise generator.

==== Applied Engineering Super Music Synthesizer ====
Super Music Synthesizer is a 16 voice music synthesizer created by Applied Engineering which can play songs written for the ALF Music Card.

==== Applied Engineering Phasor ====
Phasor is a stereo music, sound and speech synthesizer created by Applied Engineering that can play songs written for the ALF, Mockingboard and Super Music Synthesizer and the 1986 Applied Engineering Catalog claims that they actually sound better on Phasor.

==== Sweet Micro Systems Mockingboard ====
The Mockingboard provided multiple voices of sound output, and was the closest thing to a standard sound card available for the Apple series. It utilized the AY-3-8910 sound generator chip.

==== Mountain Computer Music System ====
The Mountain Computer Music System was a two-board set that provided audio output with 8-bit resolution, 16 channels stereo (up to 8 per output). A light pen was also available with the system.

=== Music Systems ===
Music systems generally include all the features of music cards, but add a method of playing the instrument directly (usually a piano-style keyboard). This allows music to be played "live", and the notes can also be captured by the computer for subsequent playback or editing and playback.

==== Alpha Syntauri ====
The Alpha Syntauri was a music system designed around the expansion capabilities of the Apple II. The hardware consisted of an external piano-style keyboard and cards that plugged into the Apple II (a keyboard interface card and music synthesizer cards). Originally the music synthesizer was ALF's Apple Music Synthesizer, and later the two-board Mountain Computer Music System was used. Software was designed to support music composition and performance. Herbie Hancock and Keith Emerson were notable early adopters of the Syntauri system. Frank Serafine used a Mountain and Syntauri system to create sound effects for the 1982 film Tron. Mauro Sabbione extensively used it while with Matia Bazar in 1982-83, which can be seen in their videos of the time.

==== Passport Designs Soundchaser ====
The Passport Designs Soundchaser Computer Music System provided similar capabilities, but the software emphasized composition over real-time performance. The Soundchaser included a 49-key keyboard, keyboard interface card, and a choice of sound cards depending on whether the digital or analog option was chosen. The digital option included the Mountain Computer Music System cards.

== Speech cards ==
=== Echo ===
The Echo II card is a speech synthesis card utilizing linear predictive coding technology, as embodied by the TMS 5220 speech chip.

The Echo Plus card utilizes the same speech chip as the Echo II, and also adds a pair of AY-3-8910 sound generator chips, and stereo output.

The Echo Cricket is an externalized version of the Echo II card, which interfaces through the Apple IIc serial port.

== Sampler cards ==
The Sonic Blaster by Applied Engineering were introduced at least by 1988 using an Apple IIGS bus slot. It's capable of 8-bit at a sample rate of 15,184 Hz in stereo and 30,368 Hz for mono.
