= AD8 =

AD8 may refer to:

- AD 8, a year in the first decade of the Common Era
- ALF AD8 music synthesizer
- Majid (Air Defense System) (AD-08), Iranian optically-tracked heat-seeking surface-to-air missile system
- USS Buffalo (AD-8), U.S. Navy destroyer-tender

== See also ==
- AD (disambiguation)
