= Music Construction Set =

Music composition notation program

Will Harvey's Music Construction Set
- Developers: Will Harvey; Richard Plom (Atari ST)
- Publisher: Electronic Arts
- Platforms: Apple II, Atari 8-bit, Atari ST, Commodore 64, IBM PC, Apple IIGS
- Release: 1983
- Genre: Composition notation

Will Harvey's Music Construction Set (MCS) is a music composition notation program designed by Will Harvey for the Apple II and published by Electronic Arts in 1983. Harvey wrote the original Apple II version in assembly language when he was 15 and in high school. MCS was conceived as a tool to add music to his previously published game, an abstract shooter called Lancaster for the Apple II.

Music Construction Set was ported to the Atari 8-bit computers, Commodore 64, IBM PC compatibles (as a self-booting disk), and the Atari ST. Two years later, in 1986, Will Harvey released a port for the 16-bit Apple IIGS, using its advanced sound. Also that year, a redesigned version for the Amiga and Macintosh was released as Deluxe Music Construction Set.

== Overview ==
With MCS, a user can create musical composition via a graphical user interface, a novel concept at the time of its release. Users can drag and drop notes right onto the staff, play back their creations through the computer's speakers, and print them out. The program comes with a few popular songs as samples. Most versions of this program require the users to use a joystick to create their songs, note by note.

The original Apple II version supports the Mockingboard expansion card for higher fidelity sound output, which software creator Will Harvey recommends ("Without the Mockingboard, it's like a peanut-butter sandwich without peanut butter"). In addition, use of the Mockingboard allows the musical staff to scroll along with the music as notes are played. Without it, the Apple II cannot update the display while playback is in progress.

== Development ==
Harvey described Music Construction Set as an accident. While working on video game Lancaster for the Apple II, the teenager wanted to add music to it. After learning the basics of music theory from others on his high school choir, Harvey asked professional musicians what they wanted in music-composition software.

== Ports ==
Electronic Arts ported MCS from the original Apple II version to the Atari 8-bit computers, IBM PC compatibles, and Commodore 64. The Atari 8-bit and C64 versions use the multi-channel audio hardware of those systems.

The IBM PC version allows output audio via the IBM PC Model 5150's cassette port, so 4-voice music can be sent to a stereo system. It also takes advantage of the 3-voice sound chip built into the IBM PCjr and Tandy 1000.

The Apple IIGS version was written by Harvey in 1986. This port takes advantage of the built-in Ensoniq wavetable sample-based synthesizer, offering over thirty instruments to choose from (sixteen are digitized and thus realistic sounding), but only two instruments can be selected per song. It supports up to 15 simultaneous voices, stereo audio and MIDI-output. A port of Deluxe Music Construction was also written, scheduled to be in stores by late 1987, but never released.

The version of Music Construction Set for the Atari ST is not a port and shares no source code with the original versions. It was written by Richard J. Plom for Intersect Software Corporation under the name The Orchestrator. It was acquired from Intersect Software by Electronic Arts and rebranded Music Construction Set in 1987. The Atari ST version is the first version to have supported the new MIDI standard, with this computer's built-in MIDI hardware.

The program was completely redesigned for the Amiga and Macintosh and renamed Deluxe Music Construction Set. This version has more features, including lyrics and support for IFF SMUS files.

== Reception ==
II Computing listed Music Construction Set third on the magazine's list of top Apple II education software as of late 1985, based on sales and market-share data. Music Construction Set sold over a million units.

Ahoy! stated that despite some limitations, Music Construction Set for the Commodore 64 "will aid both experienced songwriters and dedicated novices alike. It's a powerful music processor and a joy to use". InfoWorld's Essential Guide to Atari Computers recommended the game among educational software for the Atari 8-bit.

== See also ==
- Pinball Construction Set, EA's first program with "Construction Set" in the title from 1983.
- Bank Street Music Writer
