= Bank Street Music Writer =

1984 music composition software

- Original author: Glen Clancy
- Developer: Mindscape
- Initial release: 1985; 41 years ago
- Platform: Atari 8-bit, Apple II, Commodore 64, IBM PC

Bank Street Music Writer is an application for composing and playing music for the Atari 8-bit computers, Apple II, Commodore 64 and IBM PC. It was written by Glen Clancy and published by Mindscape. The original Atari version, developed under the name "Note Processor", was released in 1985 and uses the computer's on-board sound chip to produce four-voice music recordings. The Commodore 64 version also uses that system's sound hardware, while the Apple (with Mockingboard) and IBM PC versions require a Mindscape Music Board which was included in the retail box, or alternately use the three-voice sound chip standard with all Tandy and IBM PCjr computers.

Users can input sheet music (up to four voices on the Atari version and six on the PC) with the keyboard and play back the results or print them. The program includes several pre-entered songs, including an excerpt from the Nutcracker Suite and "On Top of Old Smoky", which form the basis of the tutorial.

== See also ==
- Bank Street College of Education
- Bank Street Writer
- Music Construction Set
