= MyCoke =

Online chat game

- Website type: Internet
- Available in: 1 language
- Creator: The Coca-Cola Company
- Website: Archived official website at the Wayback Machine (archive index)
- Commercial: No
- Registration: Optional
- Launched: June 2002
- Current status: Inactive
- Written in: Java, Adobe Shockwave, Adobe Flash

MyCoke (formerly known as Coke Music) was a website used for marketing the Coca-Cola brand and products. It was created in January 2002 by Studiocom (Now VML Inc), an Atlanta-based digital agency using core technology from Sulake Corporation, the video game company responsible for a similar popular online game called Habbo Hotel. The site hosted multiple games, sweepstakes, music downloads, and Coke-related media. However, Coke Studios was the main feature of the website.

On December 6, 2007 Coke Studios closed, and encouraged users to join CC Metro, which was part of There. There was closed on March 9, 2010. The MyCoke website remained open for multiple years to host minigames and Coke-related media.

The timeline of MyCoke eras.

== Coke Studios ==
The main focus of the game was to socialize, mix music, and decorate various interiors. The in-game currency was decibels (or DB) and they were rewarded for any of the following activities:

- Receiving 'Thumbs Up' votes from other users whilst performing music
- Drinking Virtual Coca-Colas found in crates, vending machines, and refrigerators
- Playing other games on the Coke Studios website
- Filling out surveys on the website.

There are various public studio locations within MyCoke based on real-life cities such as San Francisco, Mexico, Goa, Tokyo, and London. In these public areas, users can queue up to play a song they've created with the music mixer on a stage.

Version 2, or "v2", of Coke Studios was released in late 2004 on a new technology platform called Galapagos, created by Studiocom, and featuring new locations and a special double-reward 'Coca-Cola Red Room'.

=== Promotions ===
Coke Studios had sponsored several high-profile films and television shows including:

- Shark Tale in October 2004
- Batman Begins in June 2005
- American Idol in April 2005, 2006 and 2007
- FIFA in June 2006
- NCAA in 2007

During these sponsorships, the in-game client released furniture advertising such shows. The Shark Tale sponsorship changed the entire game, turning every avatar into fish in the style of the characters in the movie, and the rooms were underwater themed. There were also new minigames to be played. Additionally, there was lot of cross-promotion with My Coke Rewards. Many game items, including the promotional NCAA items, had to be redeemed through this reward website.

== Minigames ==
MyCoke's website also hosted a number of smaller games that tied into Coke Studios. Players would be represented by their avatar (called a virtual ego or V-ego) to compete either against other players or against the clock in order to earn decibels or prizes in the form of virtual furniture. The games proved to be very popular especially during times when Coke Studios was not open as well as when Coke Studios was at full capacity. The games also used a lobby system similar to Coke Studios if they involved more than one player. The games offered were:

- V-ego San

V-ego San was a game of rock paper scissors set in a sumo wrestling setting, with the players dressed in sumo wrestler costumes. Players would choose a move from the available list and see if their move beat their opponent. A move that beats the other player will receive a point. However, some move combinations would result in a stalemate and give neither player a point. The player with the most points at the end of 3 rounds would win decibels and stay in the ring to face another opponent. A tie at the end of 3 rounds would result in both players going to the end of the line, as there was no sudden death situation in place. If a player won a certain number of games consecutively, they would receive a prize in the form of virtual furniture for use in Coke Studios, starting with a tatami mat and gradually getting more valuable.

- Uncover The Music

Uncover The Music was a matching game played in a jungle ruins setting where players compete to uncover matching symbols that play the same small beat, such as a jungle drum. A matching pair would give the player points. There were also two special tiles: a snake which would end the player's turn and a frog which would automatically match the player's selection. The player with the most points when all tiles were matched would receive decibels for use in Coke Studios.

- MyCoke Coaster

MyCoke Coaster was a roller coaster race between two teams of players involving memory and speed. Each team would be given a combination of colored levers to pull and pulling them in the right order caused the roller coaster car to move up the hill. The combination gradually got more complex each round, requiring both memorization skills and speed in order to beat the other team. The team that completed each round and got to the top of the incline first would win the game and be awarded decibels. Jairo Fula was a major contributor to the art and design of this game.

- Recycler

Recycler was a single player game in a factory setting. The player would have to take pieces of furniture and maneuver around moving obstacles to reach the other side and win points. If the player hit an obstacle, they would lose what they were carrying and have to start again. The game was a race against the clock to get the most points possible. If the player got a certain number of points, they would be rewarded special themed furniture, such as a robot statue or a gear chair for use in Coke Studios. There was also a high score system for players to compare their point totals against others.

- Sports Challenge Quiz Game

The trivia game was a competition between 2 players to answer questions and win points. The player with the most points at the end would receive decibels.

- Pop Quiz

Pop Quiz was a 5-player game that mixed trivia questions, photo-reveal and name-that-tune with open-ended creative competition. The creativity culminated in a rap battle. All players were given the same three lines from a fictional rhyme and each composed a fourth line to complete the quatrain. In the open-ended competition the players vote for the best line - but they cannot vote for themselves. This game was principally developed by GamesThatWork, including trivia content by Gerri Miller.

== CC Metro ==
CC Metro is an online spin-off of the virtual world There. It was developed by Makena Technologies and sponsored by the Coca-Cola corporation. It was released December 6, 2007, but closed on March 9, 2010 because of the closure of There. In CC Metro, activities were focused on music, and entertainment. The virtual world included a hoverboard skate park and a theater presenting Coca-Cola videos. Players could use a "music mixer" tool to develop their own music. The chat system was focused on textboxes or voice over IP. Players could create their own customized avatar, and could obtain property, and buy pets and vehicles. CC Metro allowed players to use My Coke Rewards points to obtain various items in the game.

Carol Kruse, vice president of Global Interactive Marketing at Coca-Cola, stated in an interview that "to evolve Coke Studios we needed a digital partner that offered technology and capabilities that we didn’t have". She further stated that "There.com’s digital platform offered more flexibility and creativity to develop a more lifelike world through which we can deliver greater and more varied content."

The virtual world was officially shut down on March 9, 2010.

On May 18, 2011, Michael Wilson announced that There.com will be re-opening, on the There.com homepage. All previous members will have access to their old avatars.
