= Will Harvey =

American computer programmer and businessperson (born 1966/1967)

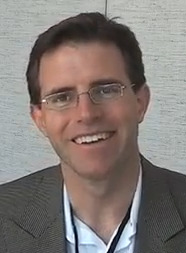
- Harvey in 2006
- Born: 1966 or 1967 (age 59–60)
- Occupations: Programmer; Businessman
- Notable work: Music Construction Set (1984); Zany Golf (1988); The Immortal (1990)

Will Harvey (born 1966 or 1967) is an American software developer and Silicon Valley entrepreneur. He wrote Music Construction Set (1984) for the Apple II, the first commercial sheet music processor for home computers. Music Construction Set was ported to other systems by its publisher, Electronic Arts. He wrote two games for the Apple IIGS: Zany Golf (1988) and The Immortal (1990). Harvey founded two consumer virtual world Internet companies: IMVU, an instant messaging company, and There, Inc., an MMOG company.

== Education ==
Harvey went to the Nueva School for middle school. He attended Crystal Springs and Uplands for high school, graduating in 1984. After high school, Harvey did not intend to pursue studies in computer science, but eventually earned Bachelor's, Master's, and Ph.D. degrees in that discipline, all from Stanford University. During this period, he started two game development companies and published several additional software products through Electronic Arts.

== Career ==
After acquiring a Commodore PET in 1979, which he paid for with earnings from a newspaper delivery route and splitting the cost with his parents, the first program Harvey developed was a project for a mathematics class to implement Wythoff's game. He then wrote Grade Base Manager, a program to automate a norm-referenced test for his mother, a teacher at Menlo College. His first published game was Lancaster, an abstract shooter for the Apple II, released in 1983. He said:

When I wrote the video game I was just fifteen. I did not know any better, so I wrote this video game that I thought was as good as any other game being sold at the time. I wanted to find a publisher but I was only fifteen, so I did not know anything about publishers. I went to a local computer shop, looked at the back of the boxes on the games in the computer shop, and found the one that had the best package artwork. That is how I picked my publisher. The company was Sirius Software in Sacramento.

Harvey contacted the president of Sirius, but the game was eventually released by minor publisher Silicon Valley Systems in 1983 and was not successful. He said the game's name was derived from the logo design: "I was designing a logo and I didn't know what to call it. The letters LANC fit together really nicely, so I had to think what on earth began with LANC that I could call the game."

Because he needed to transcribe sheet music for the computer to generate music for Lancaster, he developed a program which was published by Electronic Arts in 1984 as Music Construction Set. It was a tremendous success, described by Paul Freiberger of InfoWorld as "one spectacular accident".

Following the success of Music Construction Set, Harvey ported Atari Games's Marble Madness to the Apple II and the Commodore 64 (1986) and developed two original games, Zany Golf (1988) and The Immortal (1990). All three projects were for Electronic Arts. The Immortal and Zany Golf were written for the Apple IIGS and ported to other systems by EA.

=== Other companies ===
In the mid-90s, Harvey founded Sandcastle, an Internet technology company that addressed the network latency problems underlying virtual worlds and massively multiplayer games. Sandcastle was acquired by Adobe Systems.

Harvey was one of the chief technical architects at San Francisco game studio Rocket Science Games, a company which failed in 1997.

In 1998, Harvey went on to found There, Inc., which produced a virtual 3D world designed for online socializing.

In 2003, Harvey founded IMVU, which combined the idea of avatars with instant messaging.

In 2011, Harvey founded Finale Inventory, an inventory management system that helps companies achieve smooth running operations.

== Games ==
- Lancaster (1983, Silicon Valley Systems)
- Music Construction Set (1984, Electronic Arts)
- Marble Madness (1986, Electronic Arts), port of the arcade game
- Zany Golf (1988, Electronic Arts)
- The Immortal (1990, Electronic Arts)
