= Mockingboard =

Computer sound card

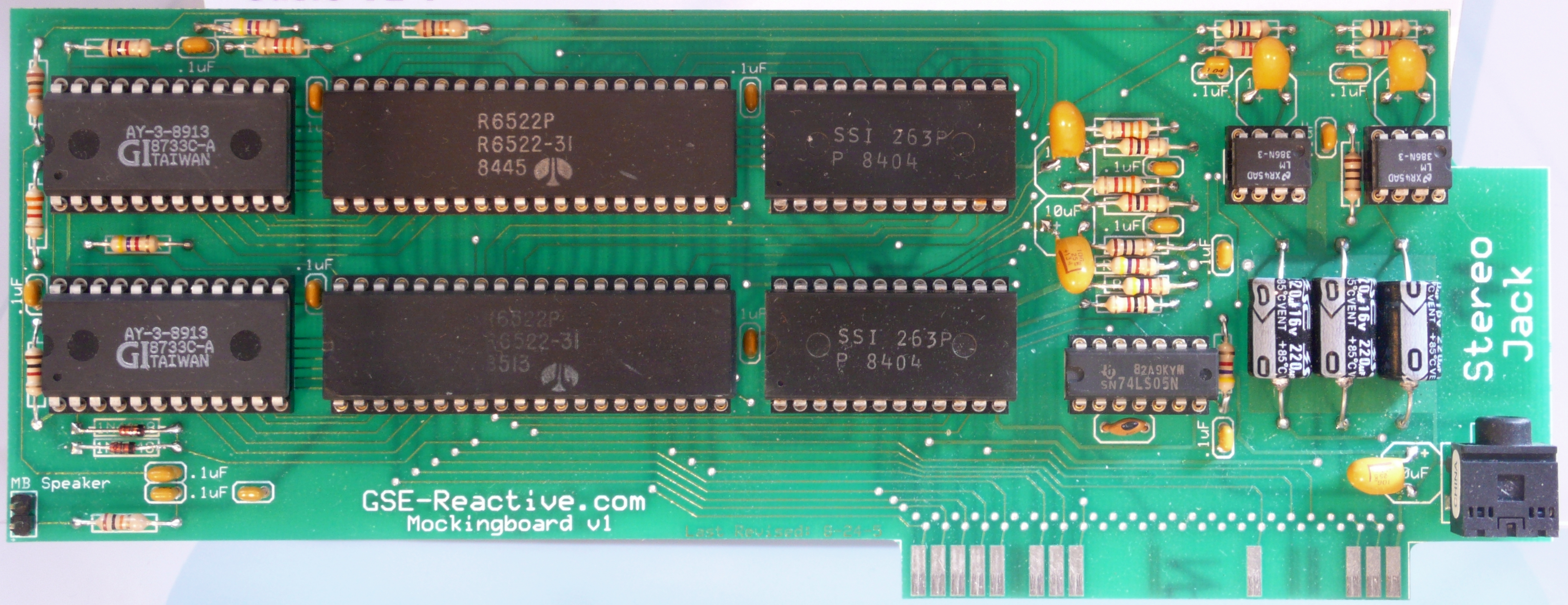
Mockingboard v1 clone

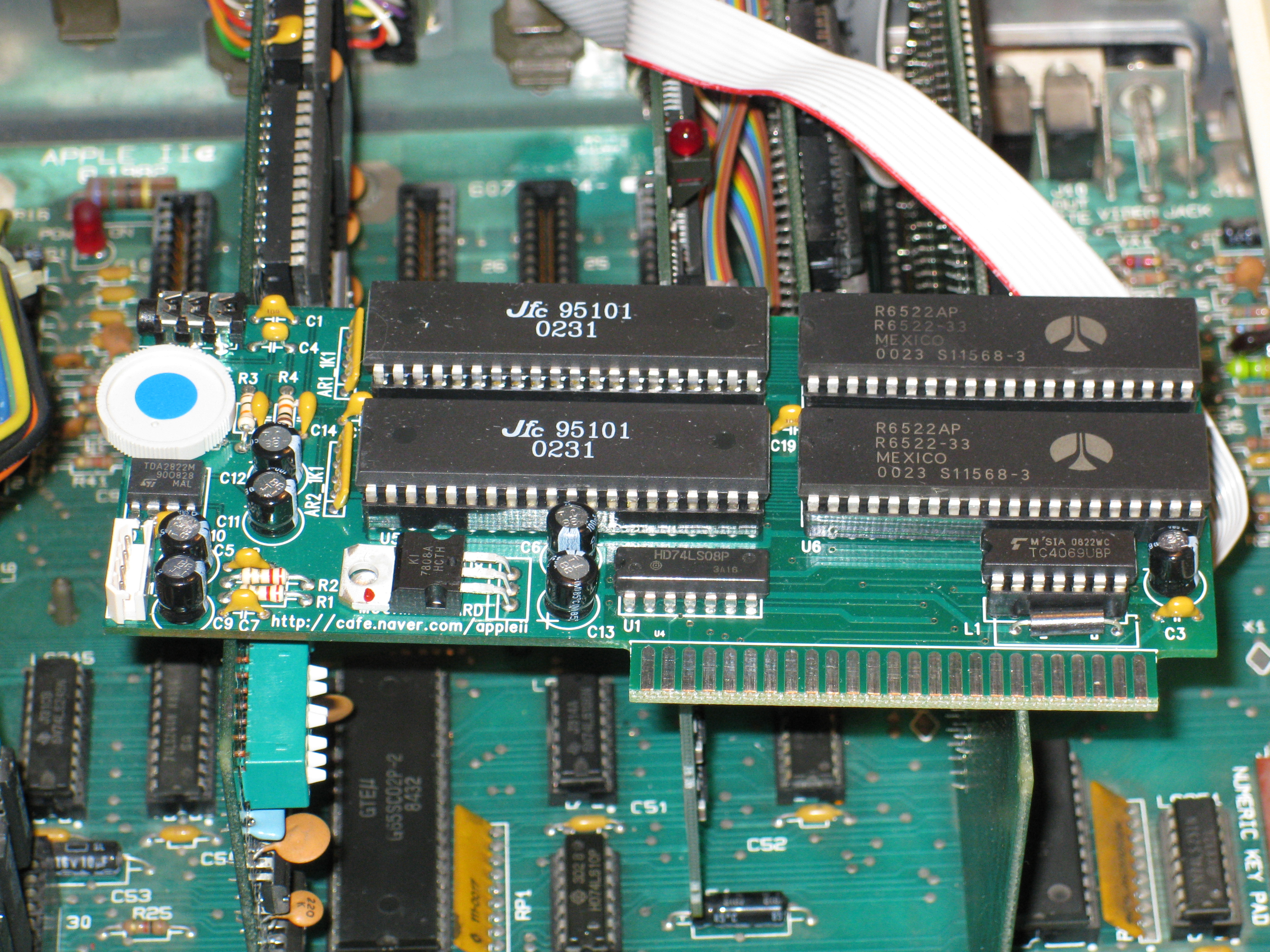
Korean Mockingboard clone

The Mockingboard is a sound card built by Sweet Micro Systems for the Apple II microcomputers. It provides multiple channels of sound synthesis using one or more AY-3-8910-style sound chips, and some models also offer speech synthesis using Votrax-style speech chips. It improves on the Apple II's limited sound capabilities, as did other Apple II sound cards. Mockingboard cards are supported by many Apple II software products.

== History ==
In 1981, Sweet Micro Systems began designing products not only for creating music, but speech and general sound effects as well, culminating in the release of the Mockingboard in 1983. The Sound II was introduced at US$199 (equivalent to $640 in 2025), and the Sound/Speech I at US$299 (equivalent to $970 in 2025). The Mockingboard's hardware allowed programmers to create complex, high-quality sound without need for constant CPU attention. The Mockingboard could be connected to the Apple's built-in speaker or to external speakers. However, as the quality of the built-in speaker was not high, the instruction manual recommended obtaining external speakers.

The Mockingboard was available in various models for either the slot-based Apple II / Apple II Plus / Apple IIe systems or in one special model for the Apple IIc. Sound was generated through one or more AY-3-8910 or compatible sound chips, with one chip offering three square-wave synthesis channels. The boards could also be equipped with an optional speech chip (a Votrax SC-01 or compatible chips such as the Arctic-02, SSI 263P, SSI 263AP or 78A263A-P).

Some software products supported more than one Mockingboard. Ultima V supported two boards, for a total of 12 voices, of which it used eight. Most other programs supported at most one board with six voices.

An IBM PC-compatible version was developed, but was only distributed with Bank Street Music Writer.

== Models ==
=== Early models ===
- Sound I: one AY-3-8910 chip for three audio channels, clocked at 1 MHz
- Speech I: one SC-01 chip
- Sound II: two AY-3-8910 chips for six audio channels
- Sound/Speech I: one AY-3-8910 and one SC-01

=== Later models ===
- Mockingboard A: two AY-3-8913 chips for six audio channels and two open sockets for SSI-263 speech chips
- Mockingboard B: SSI-263 speech chip upgrade for Mockingboard A
- Mockingboard C: two AY-3-8913 and one SSI-263 ("A+B=C", essentially a Mockingboard A with the Mockingboard B upgrade pre-installed, only one speech chip allowed)
- Mockingboard D: for Apple IIc only, not software compatible with the other Mockingboards, two AY-3-8913 and one SSI-263
- Mockingboard MS: Bundled with Mindscape's Bank Street Music Writer, with two AY-3-8913 chips and an open socket for one speech chip. This model included a headphone jack and a jumper to permit sound to be played through the Apple's built-in speaker.

=== Other compatible cards ===
- Mustalgame Card: Mockingboard clone from Capital Computer Co (Hong Kong) with two AY-3-891x chips. Integrated Software Automatic Mouth (S.A.M.) for speech synthesis. Amplifies Apple II speaker sound without need for interconnecting cable.
- The Applied Engineering Phasor used four AY-3-891x chips to provide a 12-channel music synthesizer, four white noise generators and speech support, with stereo output. It was compatible with software designed for the Mockingboard, in addition to software for the ALF Apple Music Synthesizer, Echo and Super Music Synthesizer boards. It could be used in Apple II and Apple IIGS machines, where it could provide sound support for software that did not yet support the IIGS sound chip. The Phasor came with demonstration software for playing music, speech and sound effects, and the Compose music editor.

=== Modern cards ===
- Mockingboard-T: A variant of the Mockingboard Sound II using tubes. Developed by A2Heaven.
- Mega Audio: emulates 2 x Mockingboard cards without voice support, 1 x ALF Music card, 4 x S.A.M.-cards (4 x DAC). Developed by A2Heaven.
- Mockingboard v1: A clone of the Mockingboard A from GSE-Reactive
- Mockingboard v2.2: A variant of the Mockingboard A with some minor enhancements from ReActiveMicro.
- Mockingboard for IIc: This Mockingboard variant is software compatible with the other Mockingboard A/C without voice designed for the Apple IIc. It installs on the CPU socket. Uses two AY-3-8912 and CPLD for IO Bus interface. Developed by Ian Kim in South Korea.
- SD Music card: First FM sound card for Apple II, uses a YM2413 and ATmega128 to emulate Mockingboard A/C without voice support. It provides a maximum of nine voices and provides direct register control for the YM2413. Developed by Ian Kim in South Korea.
- SD Music Deluxe (OPL3): OPL3(YMF262) Mockingboard I/II/A/C emulated sound card, Stereo sound and user defined instruments voice channels, Direct control for RAW data. VGM player supported. Developed by Ian Kim in South Korea.
- A2FPGA Multicard: Provides a variant of Mockingboard Sound II using YM2149 logic with output mixed into HDMI. Available from ReActiveMicro.
- The ReActiveMicro Phasor, released in 2019, is a compatible clone of the Applied Engineering Phasor.

== Defects ==
Fenarinarsa, a member of the demoscene group French Touch, investigated and documented a problem with the AY-3-8913 chip, whereby the output had poor bass response. This affects all cards that use the AY-3-8913 and can be demonstrated with Cybernoid. A hardware patch is available that replaces the AY-3-8913 with a AY-3-8910 or YM2149.

== See also ==
- Apple II peripheral cards
