= There (virtual world) =

2003 social virtual world video game

- Logo used for the 2012 relaunch
- Developer: Makena Technologies
- Platforms: Windows macOS (2025 private alpha)
- Release: January 9, 2003 (original); May 2, 2012 (re-launch)
- Genre: Virtual world
- Mode: Multiplayer

There is a 3D online virtual world developed and operated by Makena Technologies. The platform opened to the public in October 2003 after a two-year beta and counted more than one million registered members by 2009.

Designed for social play rather than combat, the world lets players create custom avatars, build and trade user-generated items, and participate in activities such as buggy races, paintball games, hoverboard challenges and player-hosted events. Land is offered as customizable zones and neighborhoods with an in-game rent system, and all transactions use the in-game currency, Therebucks (T$). Corporate partnerships have featured areas and content from companies like Coca-Cola, MTV, CosmoGIRL! and Paramount Pictures.

There shut down on March 9, 2010, but relaunched on May 2, 2012 under a US$10 monthly subscription model. Interest spiked again in April 2025 after a YouTube documentary went viral, drawing more than 14 million views and prompting a large surge of returning and new players.

== History ==
=== Development and initial run (1998–2010) ===
There Inc. was founded in 1998; closed beta began in July 2001 and the world launched publicly in October 2003. Tom Melcher, formerly of CNET, was chief executive officer until 2003.

Lagging growth led to major layoffs in August 2004 and a split into two entities: Forterra Systems - targeting government simulation - and Makena Technologies for the consumer product.

A US$14 million funding round followed in 2005, and partnerships with corporate advertisers like MTV Networks and Coca-Cola brought a new revenue stream and new content to the world. (see corporate partnerships)

In December 2007, the syndicated talk show Dr. Phil featured There.com in a segment about a 13-year-old girl's use of the service; Makena chief executive Michael Wilson appeared on the program to discuss the platform's parental controls.

On March 2, 2010 Makena announced that There.com would close; servers went offline at 11:59 p.m. PST on March 9, 2010.

=== Relaunch and 2025 revival (2012–present) ===
Founder Michael Wilson confirmed plans to reopen in May 2011, and the world returned on May 2, 2012 with a subscription model and two free-trial tiers.

Interest resurfaced in 2025 when YouTuber Globert posted a video in which he played the game for thirty days. Massively Overpowered reported a population surge and revived in-game events, crediting the video for the spike.

== Gameplay and features ==
=== Avatars and social tools ===
Players create avatars with permanent names and genders and fully customizable appearance. Communication options include text chat, voice, emotes and avatar “body language.”

Makena released ThereIM, a stand-alone instant-messaging client, and ThereConnect, a Facebook plug-in that syndicated in-world events.

=== Economy ===
==== Currency ====
The in-game currency, Therebucks (T$), can be purchased on the website and are valued at 1800 T$ = US$1. They can also be earned via various other methods, including events, random drops, and designing content for the world via the Development Program.

==== Property ====
Members can buy or rent virtual real estate and furnish it as homes, clubs, game rooms or racetracks.

Property comes in two forms:

- Fixed-location zones - static houses, “fun zones” and “frontier zones” that charge a monthly rental fee.
- PortaZones (PAZs) - portable lots that can be dropped, picked up and moved at will; no rent is charged while a PAZ is undeployed.

Newer neighborhood lots expand on PAZs by letting multiple owners form planned communities.

==== User-generated content ====
Users create custom content with There's developer toolkits, using third-party image editing and 3D modeling software to bring clothing, vehicles, buildings, furniture and other items into the game. Once peer-reviewed, items are listed in the virtual marketplace and sold for Therebucks or sold directly to other players.

=== Activities ===
Popular pursuits include player-run events, paintball, flying jetpacks, treasure hunts, card games and training virtual pets. As of March 2009, the main map featured 14 themed islands plus dozens of smaller atolls.

== Corporate partnerships ==
- In 2006 Makena partnered with MTV Networks to build branded worlds including Virtual Laguna Beach, The Virtual Hills and the Virtual VMAs.
- Coca-Cola opened the branded district CC Metro in 2007, hosting minigames and promotions.
- CosmoGIRL! sponsored fashion-oriented quests and contests.
- A 2008 deal with Paramount Pictures sold movie sound clips as US$1 avatar emotes.
- Apparel collaborations with Nike and Levi's offered branded clothing items.

== See also ==
- Active Worlds
- CC Metro
- PlayStation Home
- Second Life
- Twinity
