= The Immortal (video game) =

1990 video game

- Apple IIGS cover art
- Developers: Will Harvey; Electronic Arts (Genesis)
- Publisher: Electronic Arts
- Designers: Will Harvey; Ian Gooding; Michael Marcanted; Brett G. Durrett
- Composers: Douglas Fulton (IIGS); Rob Hubbard; Michael Bartlow
- Platforms: Apple IIGS, Amiga, Atari ST, MS-DOS, NES, Genesis
- Release: IIGS, NES: NA: November 1990; Genesis: NA: November 1991; EU: April 1992
- Genre: Action-adventure
- Mode: Single-player

The Immortal is a 1990 action-adventure game developed by Will Harvey and released by Electronic Arts in 1990 for the Apple IIGS. It was ported to the Amiga, Atari ST, MS-DOS, Nintendo Entertainment System, and Genesis. A wizard is attempting to find his mentor in a large and dangerous labyrinth. The game has a high degree of graphic violence.

In 2020, the NES port was re-released on the Nintendo Classics service, while the Genesis port was re-released on the Piko Collection Collection 1 cartridge for the Evercade.

== Plot ==
The wizard Mordamir calls for help from deep within the labyrinth, attempting to communicate with a man named Dunric. The player, an elderly wizard, discovers the message and embarks on the quest to rescue Mordamir, his mentor and master. While descending through the labyrinth's levels, the player encounters a race of goblins and trolls engaged in war. The goblins ally with the player after their king is spared. Throughout the labyrinth, the player also faces numerous hostile creatures, including invisible shades, flying lizards, Will-o'-the-wisps, flesh-eating slimes, giant man-eating worms, a colossal spider, and a water norfalc. Along the journey, the player receives assistance from Ulindor, a warrior who serves as Mordamir's loyal bodyguard, as well as from a mysterious merchant offering helpful potions and magical items.

Throughout the journey, the player rests on straw beds scattered throughout the labyrinth. In their dreams, the player witnesses visions of an ancient civilization of peaceful dragons that once inhabited the vast caverns beneath the dungeon. The player also sees visions of the ancient, walled city of Erinoch, known for its abundant fountains of youth and eternally young inhabitants. The dragons controlled the city's water source from below the dungeon, yet the rulers of Erinoch sought to seize control of the enchanted water by launching a siege against the dragons. Mordamir crafted a weapon to eliminate all the dragons and presented it to the city's council, but for reasons unknown, he was unable to deploy it.

As the player approaches the bottom of the labyrinth, they discover a trapped and dying Dunric. Dunric reveals that Mordamir was never imprisoned but instead kidnapped Dunric's daughter to lure him into the labyrinth as a trap. Mordamir is also revealed to have been the merchant, in disguise. Through a dream vision, it is revealed that the city's army wiped out the entire dragon race in a brutal battle, except for one dragon that escaped the dungeon and returned to destroy the city and its inhabitants in retaliation for the death of its kind. Mordamir, the sole survivor of his civilization 1,000 years later, and the last remaining dragon, confront the player in a final battle.

== Gameplay ==
The game takes place in a labyrinth with 8 levels (7 levels on the Nintendo version). The player must solve puzzles, avoid deathtraps, use magic spells, and acquire various items. Certain items will bring instant death to the player if used unwisely. Some magical items and objects can be purchased from a merchant character in certain levels, using gold pieces acquired. The player can also search chests or loot bodies for items.

A variety of non-player characters wander or protect a specific portion of the map. Fireball spells can be freely used to dispatch these enemies on the isometric field, but not in combat mode, which is initiated upon touching them. The player can dodge, and swing and stab with a sword. Certain levels allow the player to possess a flying magic carpet, cast a levitation spell, and paddle a floating barrel.

== Development ==
Will Harvey had started development on an Apple II game to be called Campaign, intended to become an online multiplayer role-playing game. As its story developed, it became a single-player game only. The music for the Apple IIGS version was composed by Douglas Fulton. On some conversions, Rob Hubbard and Michael Bartlow are credited.

== Reception ==
Reception

Review score
Publication	Score
GamePro	NES: 21/25

Award
Publication	Award
MegaTech (1991)	Hyper Game Award

Computer Gaming World praised The Immortal's graphics, but stated that the game was really an arcade game as it was too linear to succeed as an RPG. It criticized the use of save points and the controls, and concluded that the game "misses the target". In 1992, Dragon gave the game 4 out of 5 stars. Computer and Video Games magazine was positive about the graphics and control scheme and gave an overall score of 93 out of 100.

Amiga Power was mixed, awarding the game 76% and criticising its completely linear nature and lack of replay value, while identifying the graphics as a strength.

Jim Trunzo reviewed The Immortal in White Wolf #26 (April/May, 1991), rating it a 4 out of 5 and stated that "For fantasy gamers who enjoy using their natural dexterity as well as their minds to win a game, The Immortal may well be the game they've been waiting for. With its splendid graphics, constant action and fantasy flavor, The Immortal is a computer game that will satisfy players for a very long time, if not forever!"

It has been reviewed in The One for ST Games, The One for Amiga Games, VideoGame, Computer and Video Games, CU Amiga, ACE (Advanced Computer Entertainment), Datormagazin, Your Amiga, The One, Mean Machines, Zero, Joystick, Zero, The One Amiga, ST Format, Amiga Computing, Raze, Australian Commodore and Amiga Review, Amiga Format, Zzap!, Amiga Action ASM (Aktueller Software Markt), ST Format, Enchanted Realms, Amiga Joker, and Amiga Power.
