= Qumu Corporation =

U.S. information technology company

- Type: Subsidiary
- Industry: Computer software
- Founded: 2002; 24 years ago
- Headquarters: Minneapolis, Minnesota, United States
- Parent: Enghouse Systems Ltd.
- Website: www.qumu.com

Qumu Corporation is an American information technology headquartered in Minneapolis. Qumu provides an enterprise video platform that creates, manages, secures, distributes and measures the success of live and on-demand video within the enterprise. Common use cases for the company's products include executive webcasts, virtual events, employee collaboration and training. The Qumu platform is offered in three implementation types: cloud-based software-as-a-service (SaaS), on-premises, and hybrid.

Originally focused on Global 2000 companies with high security, reliability and global video delivery requirements, in 2020, Qumu began providing its SaaS products to small and medium enterprises as video became core to operations in smaller businesses. The company's customer base includes organizations in six verticals markets: banking and finance, health and life science, professional services, manufacturing, telecommunications, and government.

== History ==
Qumu was founded in 2002, when Yahoo! purchased the dot-com era search engine company Inktomi. As part of that transaction, Yahoo received a technology for managing and publishing video assets called Media Publisher, originally developed by eScene. Two entrepreneurs and former eScene executives approached Yahoo with an offer for the Media Publisher product. They spent the next six years developing it into an enterprise video platform and renamed the company Qumu in 2008.

In 2014, Qumu acquired London-based video platform provider Kulu Valley and rebranded their video platform as Qumu Cloud.

In October 2015, Qumu named Vern Hanzlik President and CEO. Hanzlik was a founder of content management technology company Stellent, which sold to Oracle for $440 million in 2006.

In July 2020, Qumu appointed technology executive TJ Kennedy as Chief Executive Officer.

In September 2020, Qumu launched its Zoom app.

Qumu was acquired by TSX-listed company Enghouse Systems Ltd in an all-cash deal worth US$18 million in February 2023.
