= Aegis Sonix =

Amiga music sequencer program

- Developer: Aegis Development
- Release: 1987; 39 years ago
- Operating system: AmigaOS
- Platform: Amiga
- Type: Music sequencer

Aegis Sonix is a music sequencer, software synthesizer and a score editor for the Amiga created by Aegis Development and published in 1987. The application offers a combination of a notation editor and an editor of digital sounds and is able to edit IFF music instruments and other digital sound files.

== History ==
Commodore International developed but never officially released a sound application called Musicraft for its Amiga series of computers. Aegis Development bought rights to Musicraft from Commodore and contracted the original developers Mark Riley and Gary Koffler to continue its development. The application - now under the Aegis Sonix name - was released in 1987. in 1989, Aegis left the Amiga market and sold its software products to a Californian software producer Oxxi, Inc, which continued to use the Aegis brand.

== Features ==
The software includes a score, keyboard, and an instrument editor. The program uses two file formats, the SMUS file format, which is an IFF based tracker module music format, and the INSTR file format which contains the instrument data. Sonix can also read music files created by Deluxe Music Construction Set and works as a MIDI sequencer. Sonix offers 8 music tracks: the first four are usable for 4 voices of the Amiga sound hardware and also for the MIDI instruments, the other four are available only for the MIDI instruments. All 8 tracks are independent of each other and can be used at the same time. The score editor allows to write notation for sheet music. The application serves primarily a music synthesis tool for creation of analog or digital sounds and is able to edit IFF music instruments and other digital sound files.

== Reception ==
A review in the French magazine Tilt commended easy to use menus and good documentation and highlighted the combination of a notation editor and an editor of digital sounds as the main strong point of the application. The AmigaNews magazine evaluated the use of Sonix with MIDI and noted among several benefits few limitations: the program doesn't support recording of a key press on the MIDI keyboard. Sonix was also reviewed in the Keyboard magazine.

== See also ==
- Deluxe Music Construction Set
