= Robert Leff =

Computer company co-founder and financial consultant

Robert Leff co-founded the computer software distribution company Softsel in 1980, and developed the venture into a $5 billion, multi-national computer products distributor now named Merisel. Softsel (originally called Robwin Computing) initially grew out of a distribution company Leff bought from Sierra On-Line co-founder Ken Williams.
