= Zany Golf =

1988 video game

- Developer: Sandcastle Productions
- Publisher: Electronic Arts
- Designers: Will Harvey; Ian Gooding; Jim Nitchals; Douglas Fulton
- Platforms: Apple IIGS; Amiga, Atari ST, Genesis, MS-DOS
- Genre: Sports
- Modes: Single-player, multiplayer

Zany Golf, also known as Will Harvey's Zany Golf, is a fantasy take on miniature golf developed by Sandcastle Productions and published by Electronic Arts in 1988. The game was originally written for the Apple IIGS and subsequently ported to the Amiga, Atari ST, and MS-DOS compatible operating systems. In 1990, a port was released for the Sega Genesis. The game was developed by Will Harvey, Ian Gooding, Jim Nitchals, and Douglas Fulton. Harvey was pursuing his advanced degrees at Stanford University at the time.

The game is played in a 3D isometric viewpoint and allows up to 4 players. Zany Golf consists of half a golf course – nine holes, plus a bonus hole.

== Gameplay ==
At the beginning of the first hole, all players are given five strokes. On completing each hole, the remaining players are given more strokes equal to the par of the next hole. Any player who runs out of strokes is eliminated, and the other players are allowed to continue. The game ends when all players are eliminated or when the last hole is completed, and the scorecard is displayed.

Zany Golf scorecard

On all versions except the Genesis version, the mouse is used to shoot the ball by clicking on it, pulling back in the reverse direction of the eventual shot, and releasing. On occasion, fairies are placed on the course; hitting them awards anywhere from 1 to 5 bonus strokes. Also, a timer bonus may be possible. If the hole is finished quickly, the player may earn up to four bonus strokes. If a fairy is present or a timer bonus is available, it will be announced prior to the first shot.

Up to four players can play the game by taking turns, with player 1 having a red ball, player 2 a blue ball, player 3 a black ball, and player 4 a white ball. Once a player's turn is complete, it disappears from the course and is replaced by an X mark of that player's color, which cannot be disrupted by other players' balls. Multiple players can work together to hit the necessary targets on the Pinball and Energy holes. Once the drop targets or computer buttons have been hit, they need not be hit by any other player.

=== Holes ===
1. Windmill Hole (Par 2): The ball has to be shot into a windmill, or into the slide down the ramp below, to enter the second area. Shooting directly into the windmill awards a 1 stroke bonus.
2. Hamburger Hole (Par 3): The hole is covered by a bouncing hamburger, reached by bouncing the ball off a ketchup bottle that squirts. The hamburger bounces up and down when the mouse button is clicked, with more clicks resulting in higher bounces.
3. Walls (Par 2): Four walls continuously rise from the ground and fall back down. Hitting them leads down to the bottom part of the course with the hole. The third wall must be hit to get to area with the hole; if missed, the player must shoot up and around into the third area.
4. Pinball (Par 3): The level begins as a game of pinball, where the player can hit the ball with the flippers after shooting it. Two drop targets must be hit before the top left corner escape chute is activated. Although enough failures to hit the drop targets will release the ball to the bottom part of the course with the hole, hitting the targets and escape chute leads directly to the hole and activates a 1 stroke bonus.
5. Fans (Par 3): Fans positioned along the level allow blowing the ball in a different direction. The fans are activated by moving the mouse left and right rapidly.
6. Magic Carpet (Par 2): A special "magic" surface covering most of the level allows direct mouse control over the ball.
7. Castle (Par 3): The ball has to be shot up a hill, to enter into a castle or tunnels outside it, to enter the second area with the hole. Entering the castle gate, which is intermittently guarded with a portcullis, awards an additional stroke.
8. Ant Hill (Par 3): The course resembles a giant ant hill, with eight slopes facing the eight main compass directions, and holding areas behind each, with the players starting on the south holding area. At the end of all areas except the south, there is a bumper which can be activated with the mouse to hit the ball back to the top of the hill. However, the hole on the hill moves at will while a ball is in play.
9. Energy (Par 5): A two-part hole which consists of a giant computer on the lower level and a field of false holes surrounding the real hole on the top level. To complete the level, the player must hit two buttons on the giant computer, then either shoot into a suction tube or use the teleporter pad, both of which lead to the top level. Alternatively, there is a mouse hole on the bottom level which is either empty, shows white eyes, or very rarely shows red eyes if both buttons have been hit. If a ball is shot into the mouse hole while the red eyes are displayed, that player completes the level automatically and the secret level is activated. At any other time, the ball is pushed out of the hole and the shot may be re-attempted. In a multiplayer game, only one player needs to successfully enter the mouse hole. Any other surviving players that use the regular hole are also allowed to proceed to the Mystery Hole.
10. Mystery (Par 4): This bonus hole is accessed by either completing the rest of the course under par (26) or by putting into a secret hole on the Energy level with exact timing. This level consists of a Breakout-style scenario where the player is given control of a paddle with the mouse, and must hit targets on an inclined slope with the ball, causing them to drop. After all the targets are dropped, corner escape holes are activated which lead to a checkerboard-like putting green (if the hole is hit before the targets are dropped, the ball will shoot back out and all previously hit targets will pop back up). Certain squares on the green flash, which if rolled over at any time (not just while flashing) will teleport the ball back to the start of the green.

== Ports ==
Due to the lack of a mouse or similar pointing device, the Sega Genesis edition of the game omitted the "Magic Carpet" hole. Instead, the "Mystery" bonus hole from the computer versions is renamed "Knockout Nightmare" and placed after "Ant Hill".

The DOS version uses a code wheel as a form of copy protection. Before the Hamburger hole, the game gives a prompt which requires the player to rotate the wheel into a certain position. Giving the correct result allows the player to continue the game.

The musical score in the original version uses the 32-voice Ensoniq audio chip in the Apple IIGS computer, incorporating a wide variety of musical instruments and simultaneous sound effects. Ports considerably scale down the music quality and limit or remove sound effects.

== Reception ==
The game was reviewed in 1989 in Dragon #144 by Hartley, Patricia, and Kirk Lesser in "The Role of Computers" column. The reviewers gave the game 5 out of 5 stars. Compute! described Zany Golf as "a moderately challenging game with topnotch graphics and sound".
