= ALF Products =

ALF Products Inc., or ALF (named after an assembly language instruction for "rotate the A register Left Four bits"), was a Colorado company primarily known for its computer-controlled music synthesizers and floppy disk supplies and duplicators.

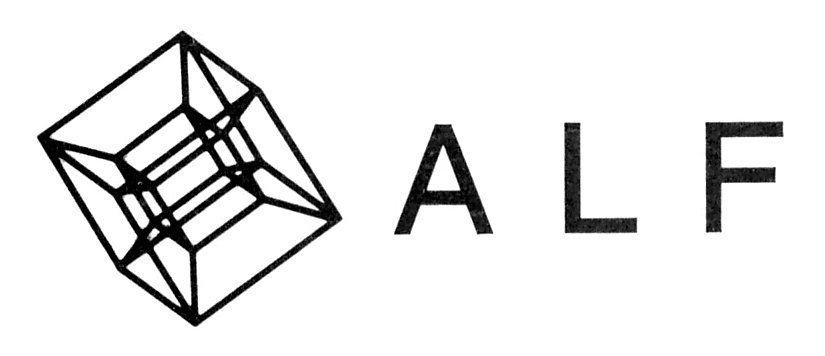
ALF Products' first logo. The line drawing, which was done using a computer plotter, is of a hypercube or tesseract.

== History ==
In 1971, Tim Gill, a Wheat Ridge High School student with an interest in computers, visited the computer terminal room at Lakewood High School looking for "other intelligent life-forms". There he met Philip Tubb, a Lakewood High School student, who shared his interest in computers. This meeting inspired Philip to start the Jefferson County Computer Club. As a freshman, Philip had served as Student President, and he had good relationships with the school's and district's staff. He was able to create the only student-founded multi-school club in the district. Using log-on messages on the county's Hewlett-Packard 2000-series time-shared computer system, club meetings were announced county-wide and held at various high schools.

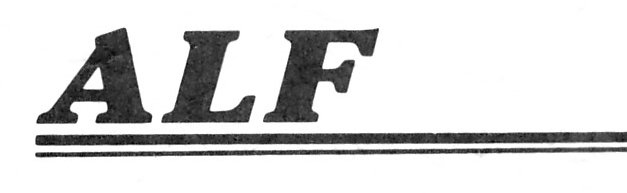
ALF Products' second logo

At the Jefferson County Computer Club, Philip Tubb met many other students who shared an interest in computers. He also shared a strong interest in electronics with John Ridges, a Wheat Ridge High School student. John designed and built one of the first computer-controlled music synthesizers, a polyphonic unit with 6 voices (each with an 8 octave range and 8 volume levels). It could be controlled by a remotely located computer when connected between a teletype (or similar device) and its modem. The ASCII serial data flowing on that connection was used to issue commands to the synthesizer. John also wrote programs in BASIC which allowed music to be entered in text format, saved on the computer's hard drive, and played back using the device. The synthesizer got the nickname "Mesmerelda" due to the hypnotic effects of its status LEDs during playback.

While a student at Lakewood High School, Philip Tubb was hired part-time to operate the district's computer. In that job, Philip also taught seminars on programming to many of the county's high school math teachers who, with little if any prior instruction, were struggling to teach the programming classes. With those contacts, Philip and John began demonstrating Mesmerelda to music classes at several high schools, introducing the students (and teachers) to this new concept of computer-controlled music. Many of the students were interested in music but not skilled enough to perform using a conventional instrument. These students were excited by the idea of using a computer to play music, eliminating the need to master an instrument first. The potential market for computer-controlled synthesizers was apparently larger than the two had assumed.

After high school, Philip Tubb joined fellow former computer club members Tim Gill and Rich Harman at the University of Colorado. Philip soon discovered the computer science classes were based almost entirely on mainframe computers, which he considered obsolete by that time. He dropped out after one semester to study programming independently. Late in 1975, Philip began discussing the idea of starting a company to make computer-related electronic products with John Ridges (who by then was a student at the University of Colorado). Colorado law at that time required an incorporator to be 21, and required at least three directors. Neither Philip nor John were 21 years old; Rich joined the project and signed the incorporation paperwork for "A L F Products Inc." in November 1975. The three served as the board of directors at ALF through 1992. The name "ALF" was chosen from a list of assembly language instructions for the Hewlett-Packard computer. It stands for "rotate the A register Left Four bits". This particular instruction was chosen largely because the letters have no curves and would therefore be easy to draw with a plotter or other line-vector graphics device.

ALF developed miscellaneous products before doing more serious work on computer-controlled music synthesizers. Several former Jefferson County Computer Club members became ALF employees, including Tim Gill (who left a job at Hewlett-Packard to join ALF). ALF created several products for the Apple II computer. Tim Gill wanted ALF to work on products for the new Apple III, but Philip Tubb had concerns about the viability of that computer. Tim soon left ALF to start Quark, Inc. and wrote Word Juggler for the Apple III. Despite this parting, ALF and Quark maintained a relationship over the years. One item ALF manufactured for Quark was a keyboard enhancement circuit that allowed Word Juggler to be used with the Apple II.

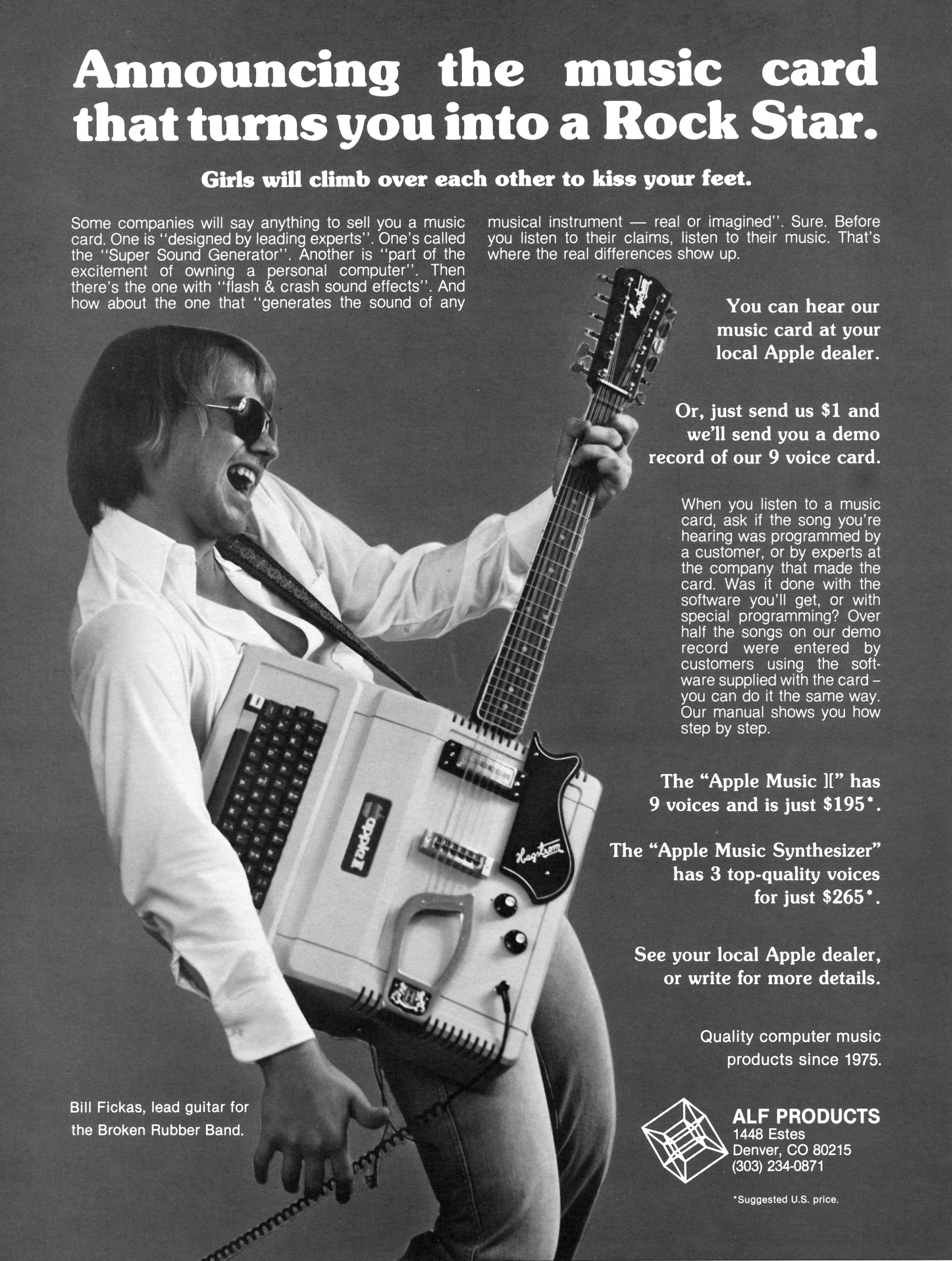
ALF's "Rock Star" ad

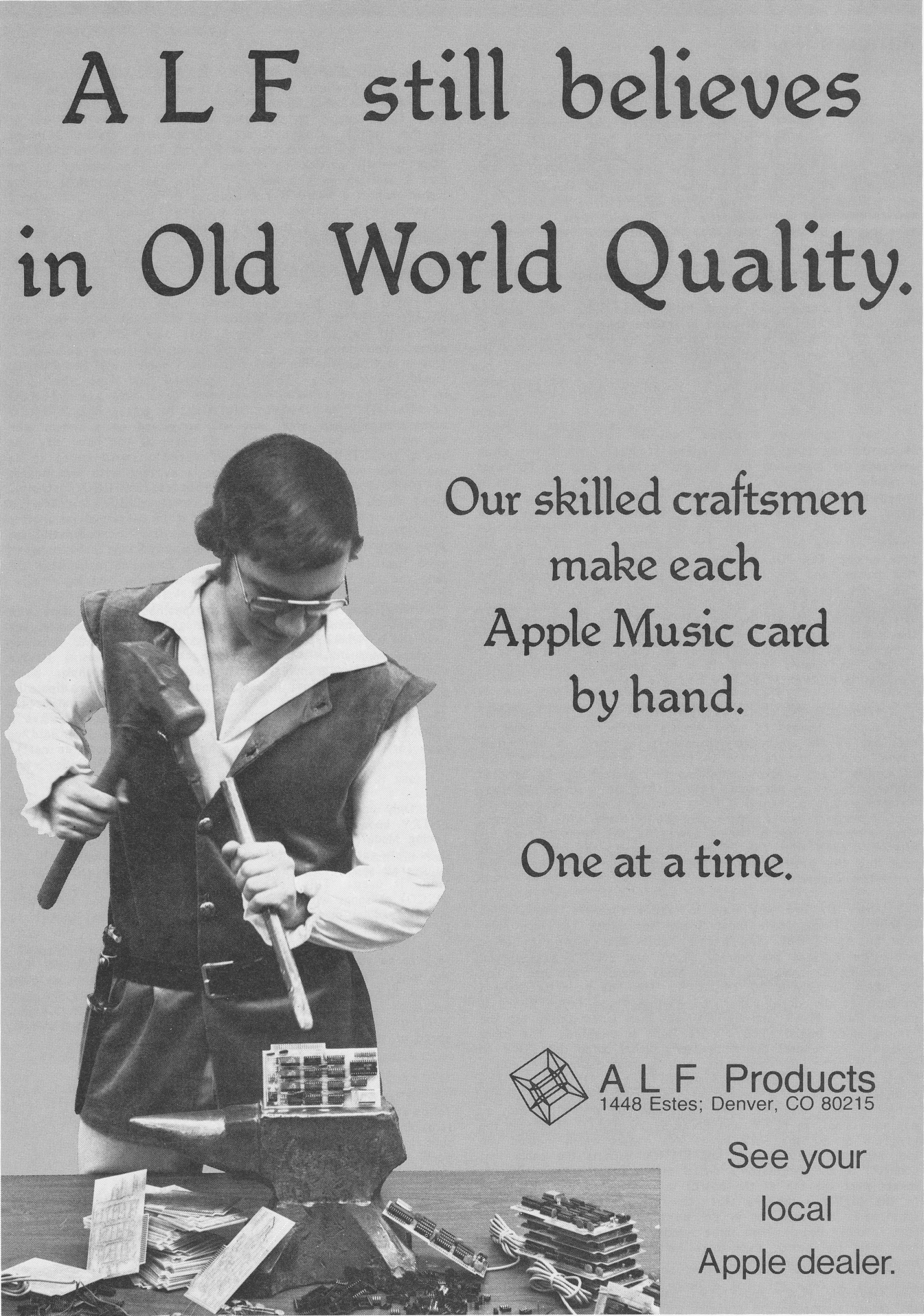
ALF's "Craftsman" ad

ALF was known for its whimsical advertisements and subtle humor in owner's manuals and product brochures. ALF's "Rock Star" ad noted that "Some companies will say anything to sell you a music card" and proceeded to ridicule selected quotes from competitors' ads. One of the quotes was actually from one of ALF's own earlier ads. The "guitarple" in the ad is not a real instrument; ALF constructed it only for the photo shoot. ALF's "Craftsman" advertisement was featured in Creative Computing's 1980 April Fools issue. The magazine, when turned upside down, appeared to be "Dr. KiloBYTE's creative Popular Personal Recreational Micro Computer Data Interface World Journal", a take-off on the names of several computer magazines at the time. This issue included 73 pages of humorous articles, with all the pages numbered in hexadecimal; ALF's ad appeared on page 3F.

As computer-controlled music became more and more popular, much larger companies began entering the market. ALF decided to switch their focus to equipment for duplicating floppy disks, which had little competition, and became a dominant supplier in that field. As compact discs began to replace floppy disks, ALF realized a larger partner was needed for that market. A buyout by Rimage Corporation, who had recently completed their IPO, was negotiated. Most former ALF employees left soon after the acquisition; Philip Tubb and John Ridges remained with Rimage for a few years.

== Products ==
=== Early products ===
ALF's first products were adaptations of the punched tape reader in the Model 33ASR Teletype which allowed it to operate at higher speeds. Display-based terminals were becoming popular for use on time-shared systems, and they could operate at higher speeds than the Teletype. ALF created an interface card which allowed the Teletype's reader, which normally reads 10 characters per second, to read at 30 characters per second when used with a display-based terminal. It was sold only to schools in the local district; no attempt was made for larger marketing. Another version allowed the reader to operate at 55 characters per second, but modems that could operate at such speeds were not widely used at that time.

Next, ALF produced a number of incidental S-100 products: a card extender, which facilitates testing an S-100 card by raising it above the other cards in the computer; an S-100 motherboard; an S-100 motherboard testing card, which simplified checking for assembly errors on a motherboard; and a random number generator. The motherboard testing card was sold though local hobby-electronics stores, and the motherboard was used in a subsequent product (the AD8).

=== AD8 Music Synthesizer ===
ALF's first computer-controlled music synthesizer, designed in 1976–1977, was called the AD8 (a homophone of 88, the number of keys on a piano). It was intended for use with any S-100 computer, but could be used with any computer via a parallel bus. The primary hardware was a one-voice synthesizer card; up to eight cards could be used to create a polyphonic system with one to eight simultaneous voices. A controller card, which had its own 6502 processor, connected to the user's computer and the synthesizer cards. Each one-voice card had the following controls:

- An 8 octave range (96 pitches)
- Volume control with 256 levels
- Two programmable waveform generators (sample-based synthesis)
  - Scanned-RAM D/A with 64 elements
  - 256 amplitude levels per element
- A low-pass filter with 16 levels
- An envelope generator
  - Rise rates of 0.004 to 1.3 seconds in 256 steps
  - Fall rates of 0.003 to 7.8 seconds in 256 steps
  - 256 sustain levels
- Stereo channel selection (left or right)

The AD8 was also able to produce various white noise effects, which were particularly useful for percussion sounds, by programming the waveform-RAMs with random numbers.

ALF created a demonstration record, "Computer Controlled Synthesizer Performances", containing performances from Mesmerelda and the AD8.

Costing almost twice a much as the Altair 8800 or similar computer required to control it, the AD8 was too expensive for most hobbyists at the time. Few systems were sold.

=== Quad Chromatic Pitch Generator ===
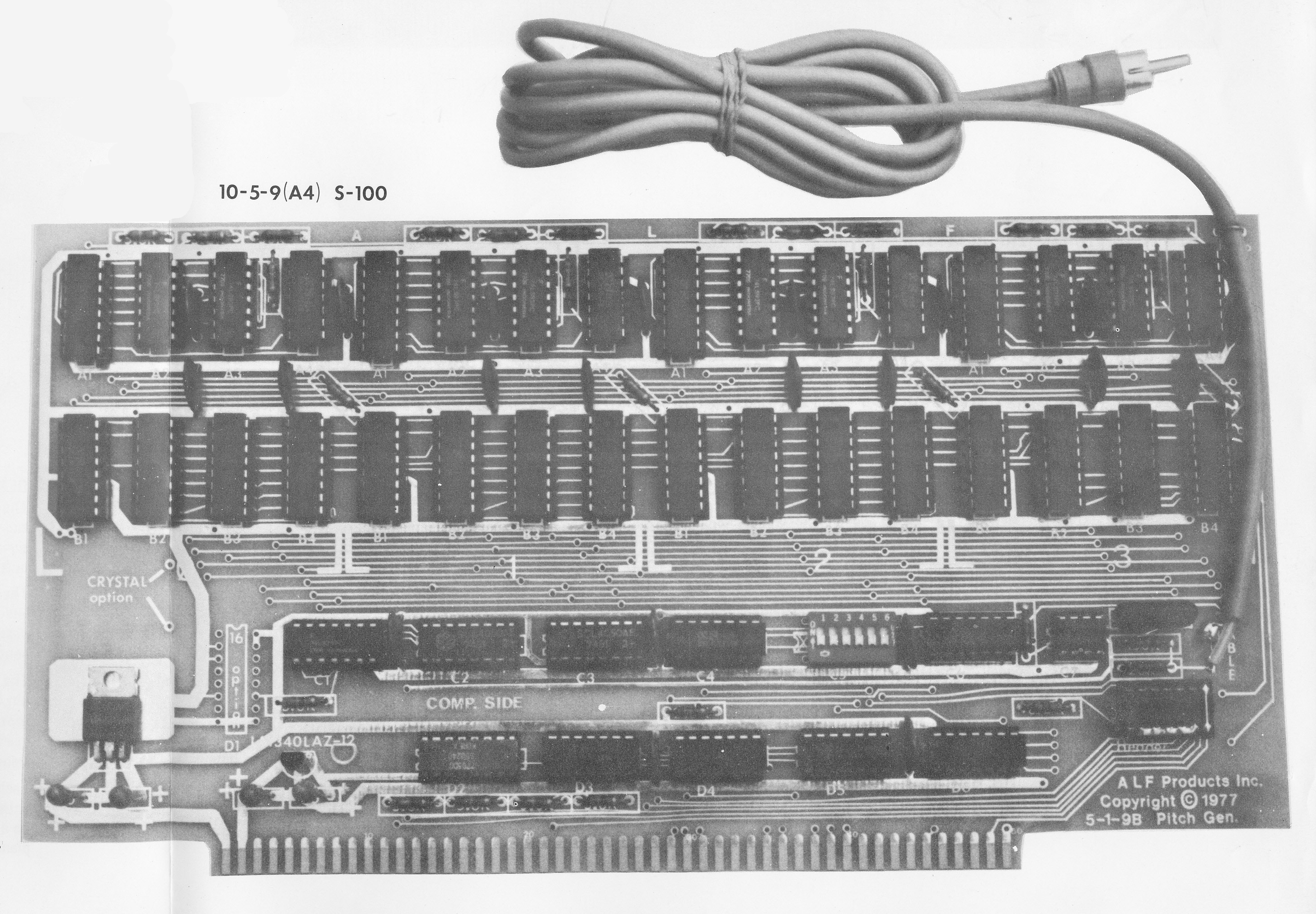
S-100 version of the Quad Chromatic Pitch Generator

Around the same time as the AD8, ALF sold a simple pitch generator card in two versions: one that plugged directly into an S-100 computer, and one that could be connected to any computer via parallel interface. Each card could produce four simultaneous voices, and multiple cards could be used in an S-100 system. There were no controls other than pitch (the same 8 octave range as the AD8). It could serve as a computer-controlled sequencer by connecting the individual voices to external equipment, such as conventional analog synthesizers. Additionally, a standard audio cable allowed connection to an ordinary audio system.

=== Apple Music Synthesizer / Music Card MC16 ===
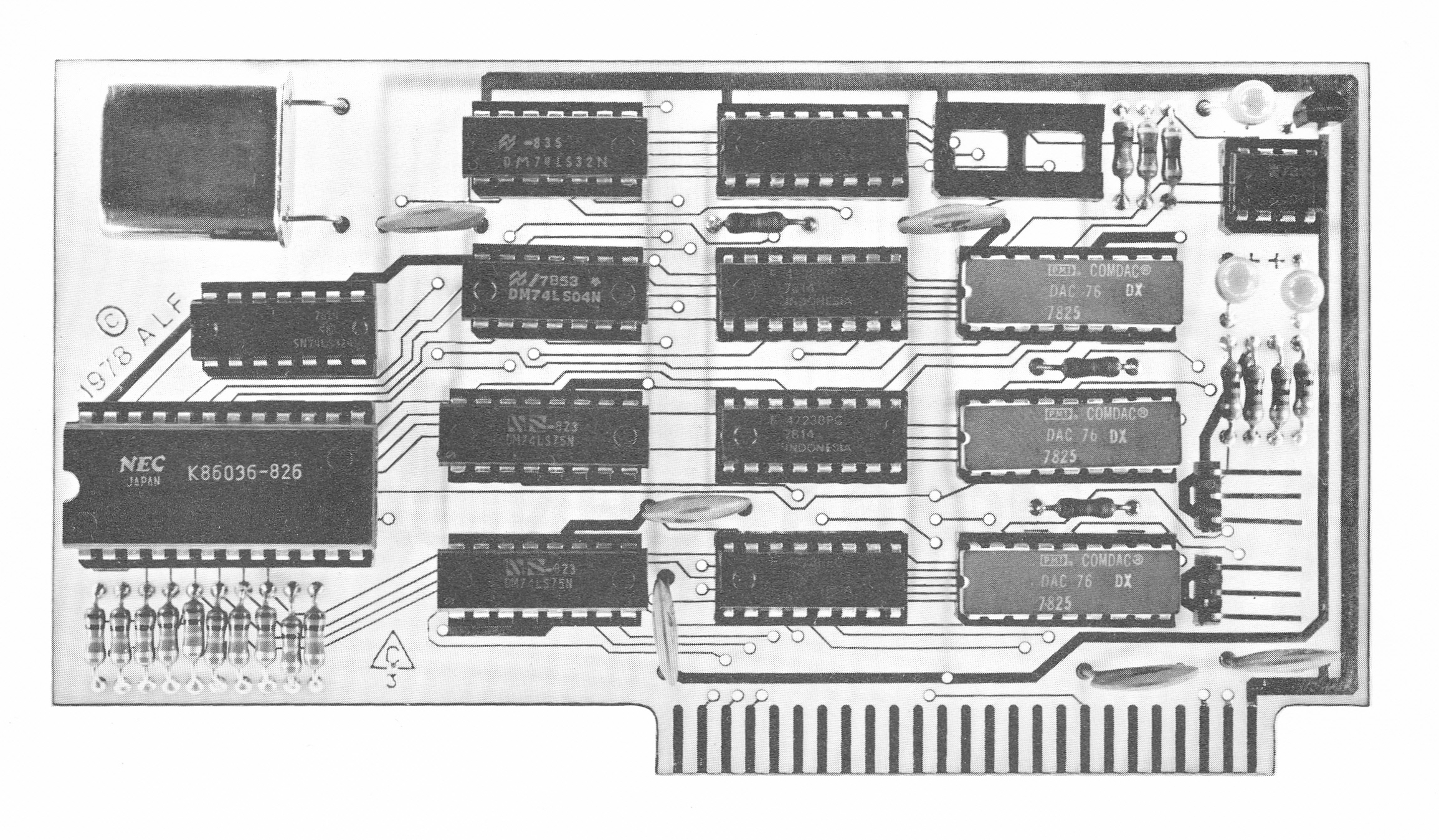
The first hardware music synthesizer for Apple II computers, ALF's MC16

The S-100 computers that customers used to control the AD8 or Quad Chromatic Pitch Generators varied widely in configuration; there was no single standard for even major items such as the type of display, keyboard interface or layout, tape device for software distribution, and so forth. This lack of standardization was a significant obstacle to ALF creating user-friendly software for their products. When Apple introduced the Apple II in 1977, it was available with only one display and keyboard format, which allowed software to be created that would work for all users. Unfortunately, the Apple II was less powerful than most S-100 computers and the accessory cards it could accommodate were physically quite small. It was necessary for ALF to design a synthesizer much simpler than the complex AD8.

ALF used the AD8 to simulate a wide variety of possible synthesizer designs. These ranged from very simple ones much like the Quad Chromatic Pitch Generator (which was obviously too simple for desirable music) to far more complex schemes using nearly the full capabilities of the AD8 (which was already known to be too expensive). These simulations could be operated in real-time and their Relative Enjoyment Factor (REF) measured to determine how usable each design would be as a functional music synthesizer. The target goal was a REF above 80. Numerous designs were evaluated and considered along with their estimated production cost. Finally, a design retaining the 8 octave range, accurate tuning, and a combination of ADSR envelope and volume control was selected; the programmable waveform generation and filtering functions of the AD8 were omitted. The final REF achieved was greater than 82.

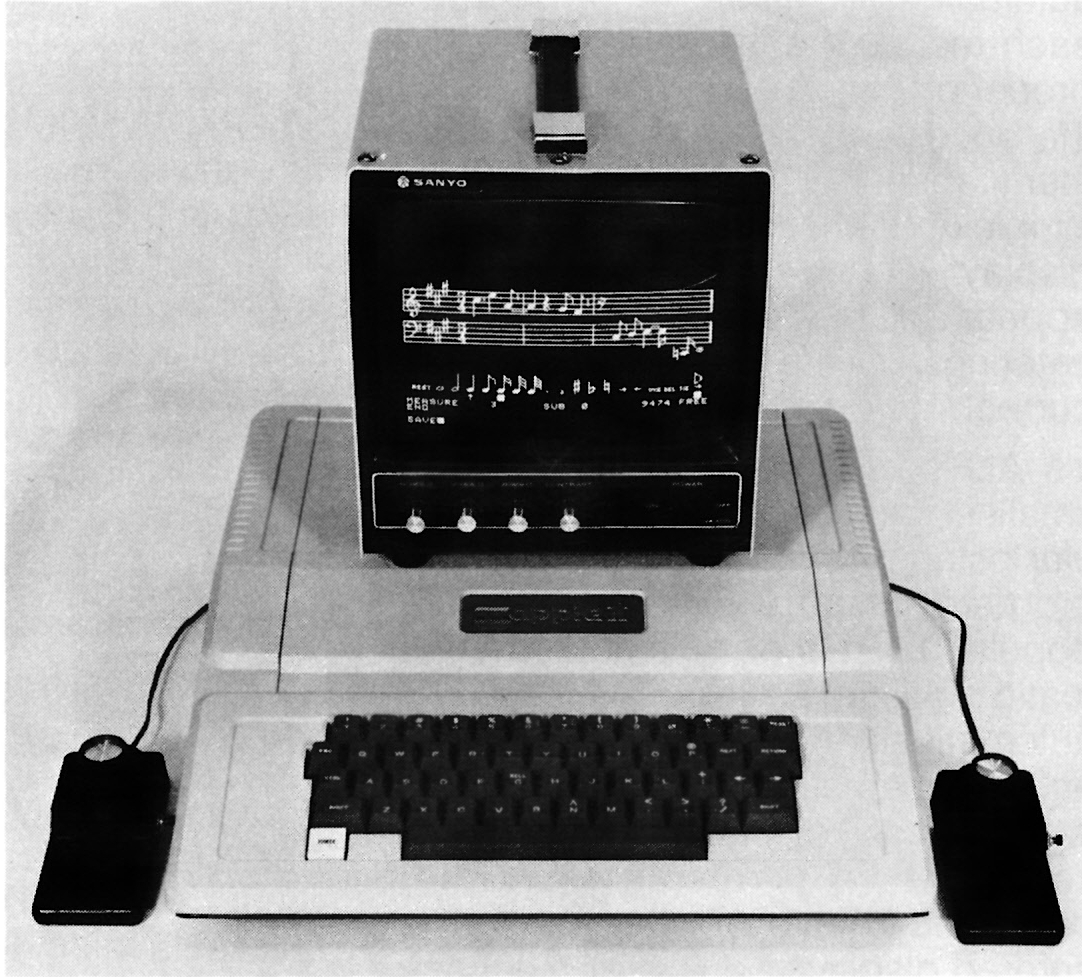
ALF's music entry program running on an Apple II

The product was originally sold as "ALF's Apple Music Synthesizer", but Apple was concerned that customers might think the product was sold by Apple rather than being Apple-compatible; ALF changed the name to "Music Card MC16" ("MC" for "Music Card" and 16 being the last digits of the product's part number). It was the first hardware music product sold for the Apple II, and was one of the largest selling hardware accessories for the Apple II (aside from Apple's diskette drive) for some time. The product was demonstrated to Apple and Apple dealers late in 1978, and volume sales began in June 1979.

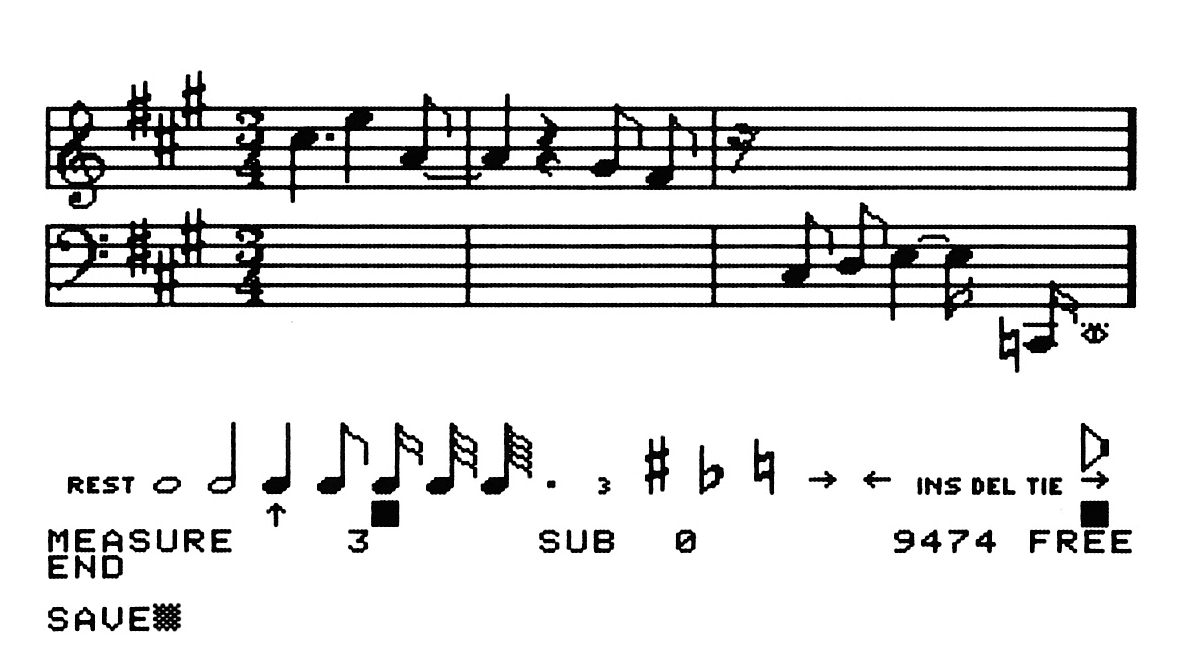
Screenprint of ALF's music entry program on the Apple II

The sophisticated software written by John Ridges for this synthesizer was the first to implement graphical entry for a personal computer music product. At the time, his music entry program was the largest Assembly Language program available for the Apple II (even larger than the entire Applesoft BASIC language interpreter), and one of the few programs to utilize Apple's hi-resolution graphics. It was also perhaps the first software for an Apple computer to use a graphical user interface (GUI) with icons and pointing elements (the "IMP" portion of WIMP interfaces); several years ahead of Apple's Macintosh. Since the Apple II had no mouse, the GUI was implemented using the Apple's "game paddles"; one moved an arrow to select the desired icon, and the other moved the selected icon to the desired position on the musical staff on the screen display. When entering a musical note, the sound of the note was simultaneously played by the synthesizer for confirmation that the correct pitch had been selected.

Advanced functions in the software allowed repeated sections of music to be played without entering them more than once, and allowed the notes to be played on multiple voices simultaneously for purposes of additive synthesis. Additive synthesis is normally performed using sine waves, but since no waveform generator (like that on the AD8) had been included, each voice could create only square waves. Additive synthesis can also be done using square waves, but the range of possible sounds is more limited (in particular, no sound less harmonically complex than the base square wave itself can be created). Tests with the AD8 had shown that very interesting sounds could be created with square wave additive synthesis when each voice used slightly different ADSR envelopes and/or small shifts in timing. Therefore, the MC16 was designed with very fine ADSR control.

Each card could produce three simultaneous voices, each with an 8 octave range (starting at the same pitch as a piano but extending 8 semitones higher) with excellent tuning accuracy (within 2 cents) and 256 envelope/volume levels with an exponential scaling (78 dB range). Each voice could also produce quarter tones (pitches exponentially halfway between each piano pitch). Two cards could be used for six voices or three cards for nine voices; with two or three cards the audio output was in stereo.

=== Apple Music II / Music Card MC1 ===
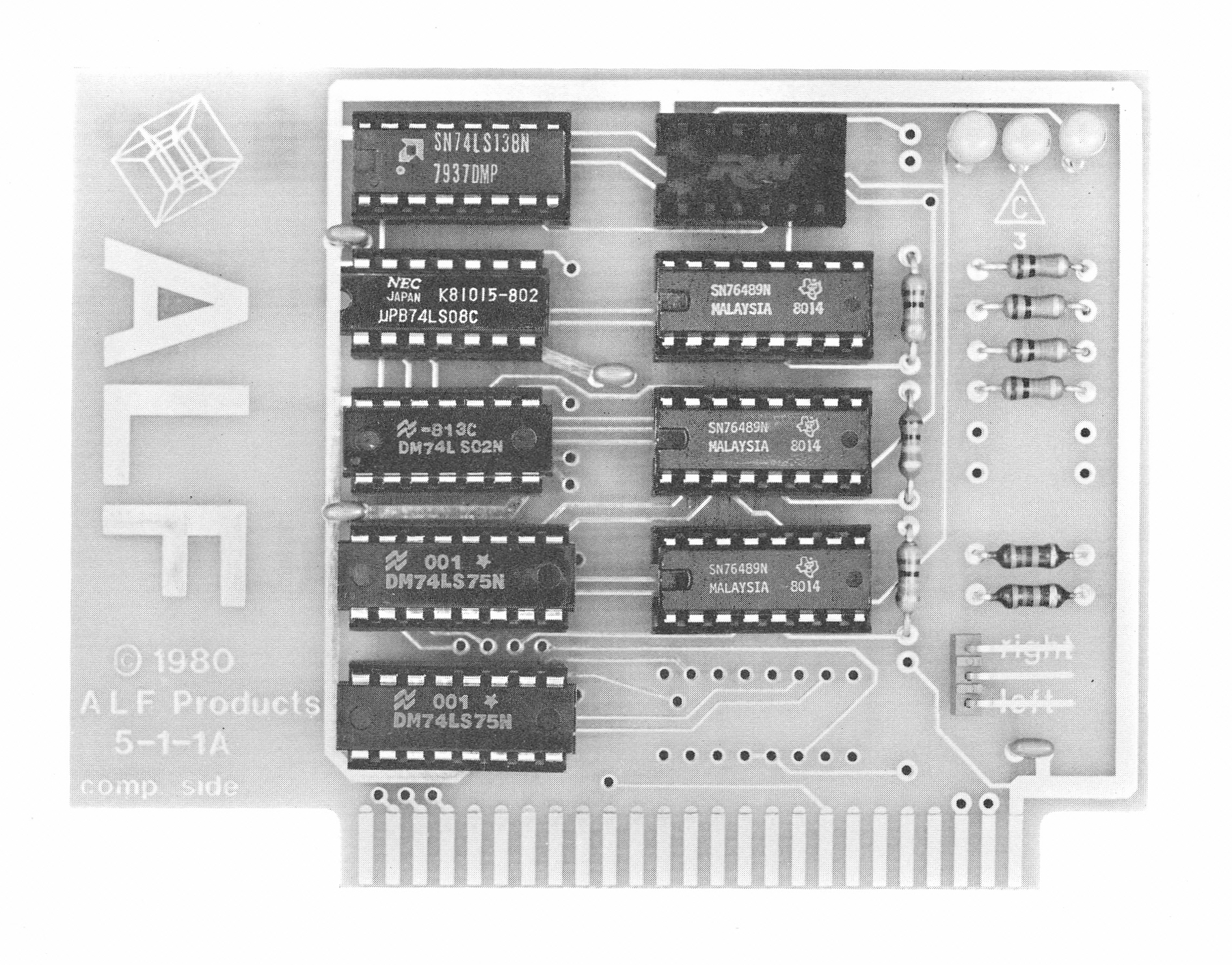
ALF's second music card for the Apple II, the MC1

After the original Music Card MC16 had been selling in volume for some time, engineers at ALF learned that Texas Instruments (TI) had put essentially the entire MC16 card's circuitry into a single integrated circuit, the SN76489N. TI had significantly reduced the pitch range and tuning accuracy, compared to the MC16, and reduced the 256 envelope/volume levels down to 16 (and the 78 dB range down to 28 dB). TI added a pseudorandom number generator circuit which could be used to create white noise effects similar to what ALF had demonstrated on the AD8 synthesizer using random amplitudes, although TI probably intended it more for sound effects than for simulating percussion instruments.

ALF designed a card with three SN76489N chips, thus allowing nine simultaneous voices (similar to three MC16 cards). The product was originally named "ALF's Apple Music II" and was later renamed (at Apple's request) "Music Card MC1". Rather than starting at the same pitch as the lowest note on a piano (A0, the A below the C three octaves below Middle C) like the MC16, the MC1 started 15 semitones higher, at C2 (the C two octaves below middle C); and rather than having an 8-octave (96 semitone) range, it had a 6-octave (72 semitone) range. The Music Card MC16's software was modified to operate the MC1.

=== MC16/MC1 accessories ===
ALF sold disks containing the data for songs, which could be played back using the MC16 or MC1 synthesizers. Many of the songs were entered by ALF's customers, and ALF paid a nominal licensing fee to them for the rights to distribute their work.

ALF also sold a disk of "Basic Ear Training Skills" which drilled students in rudimentary skills such as identifying major, augmented, diminished, or minor chords. Due to the relatively poor tuning accuracy of the MC1, the Ear Training programs were only offered for the MC16.

Other accessories included the "Timing Mode Input Board", which allowed one voice of an MC16 card to be used to control playback tempo; and "Process", a collection of editing functions and other aids for use with the music entry program.

=== PAL9000 radio direction finder ===
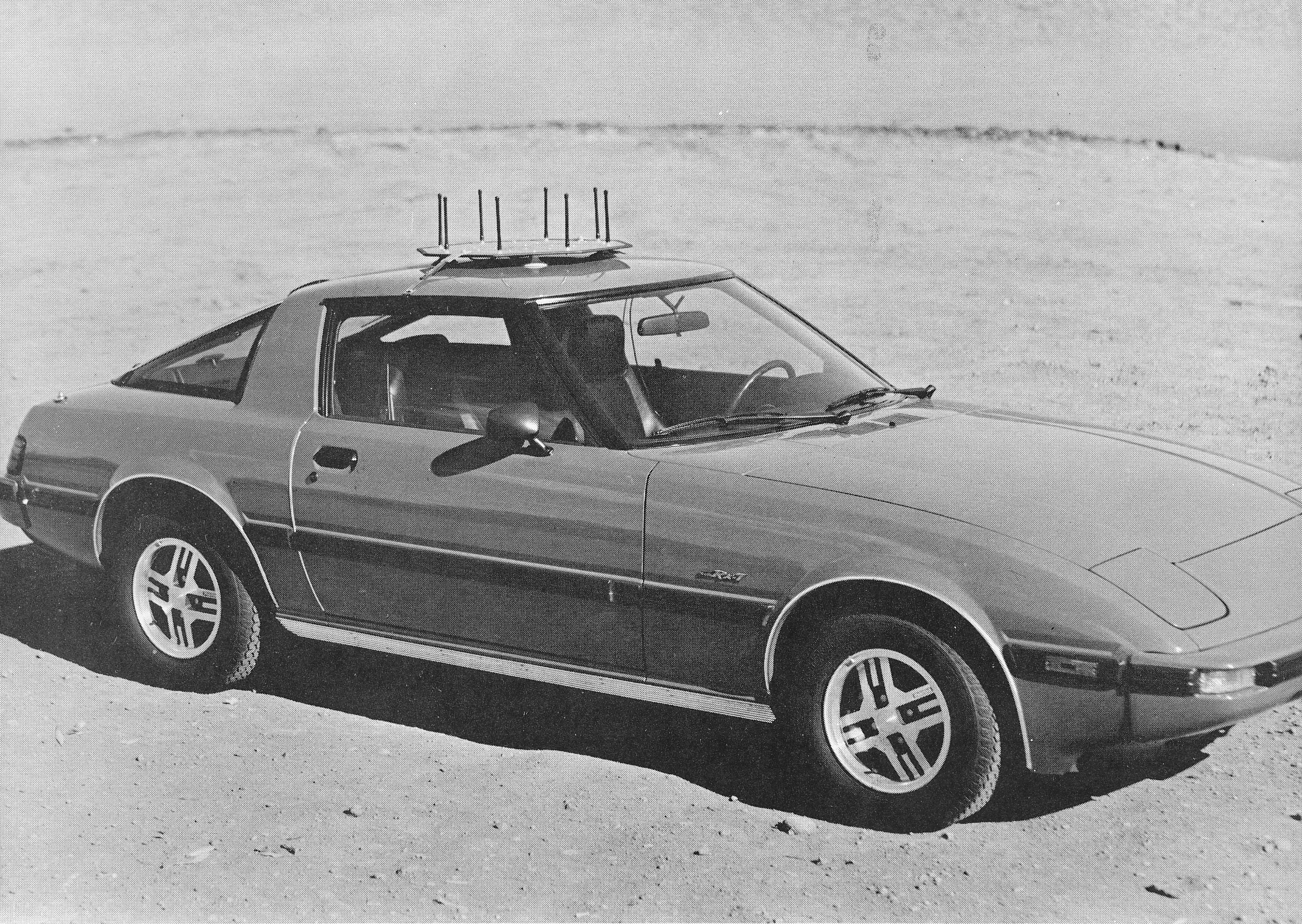
Antenna assembly of ALF's PAL9000 shown installed on a car

Moving away from music products, in 1981 ALF designed a radio direction finder designated the PAL9000 (for sequence-Phased Antenna Locator, with the 9000 being a play on the movie 2001's HAL 9000). The product consisted of an array of eight helical antennas which could be mounted on top of a vehicle, and a control box with a circle of LED direction indicators which was typically mounted inside for viewing by the driver or a passenger. It was originally intended for use in the sport of amateur radio direction finding. Customers included the US Border Patrol, who used it to track dogs they had equipped with radio transmitters, and various taxi companies, who used it to locate drivers who interfered with radio dispatch by continuously transmitting.

The product used a digital FIR filter and other advanced digital techniques to continuously determine the direction of the incoming radio signal based on its interaction with the eight separate antennas. A user-supplied FM radio or transceiver, tuned to the desired transmission frequency (within the unit's 144 to 148 MHz range), was also connected to the display unit and to the antenna assembly. The PAL9000 was excellent at indicating the direction of incoming radio signals, but in some situations use of the product was hampered by the fact that a radio signal may be coming from something reflecting the signal (such as a large building) rather than from the originating transmitter itself.

=== Copy System CS3 / Total Accuracy Copy Program ===
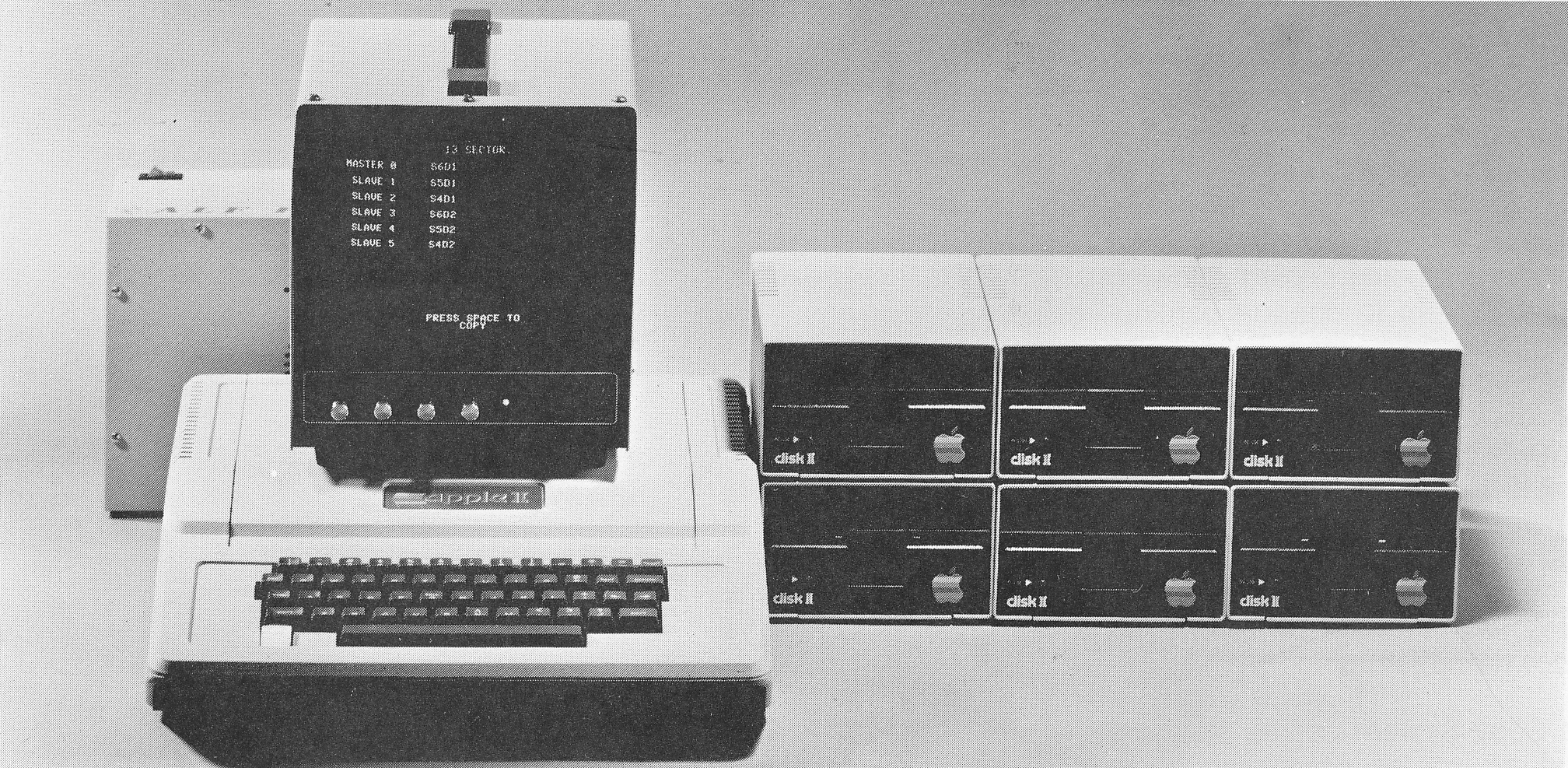
Copy System CS3, shown with six drives

When ALF began selling music cards for the Apple II, floppy disk drives were not yet common on the Apple, so the software was supplied on cassette tape. ALF worked closely with a local cassette tape duplication company, helping them modify equipment designed for voice and music to copy cassettes with data in Apple's format. They asked ALF to design equipment to copy floppy disks so they could do business in that market as well, but ALF, wanting to focus on their own products, declined. When ALF later began offering the music card software on floppy disks, they quickly discovered that existing methods for copying the disks were slow and extremely unreliable. ALF went back to the cassette duplication company to work with them on creating floppy duplicators, but by that time the cassette company had decided not to enter the floppy business.

ALF had some experience with floppy drives and hard drives, particularly with the S-100 systems, and began designing disk copying software and hardware for internal use. At computer industry conventions, ALF was often asked by other software and hardware companies how ALF was getting their disks copied, since this was a common problem in the industry. When they discovered ALF had designed their own equipment, many companies asked if they could buy the equipment or if ALF would copy their disks. ALF began copying disks for several software companies, at first largely as favors to the exhibitors ALF's employees had socialized with at the conventions. These casual arrangements soon evolved into a full-fledged disk copying service which ALF began advertising in computer magazines.

Later ALF began selling two related disk copying products. One was a software product that ran on a standard Apple II computer, but copied disks faster than Apple's software and much more reliably. The other was a product that combined that software with additional hardware to allow even faster copying. The software-only product was originally named "PenultiCopy"; "penulti" from "penultimate", meaning second best or second from the top (i.e. second compared to the hardware product), but unfortunately more often meaning next to last. This was soon changed to the more apt name of "Total Accuracy Copy Program".

The hardware-enhanced product was originally called simply "Copy System", which was later expanded to "Copy System CS3" as ALF introduced additional models of hardware-based copiers. The power supply in the Apple II was not capable of running more than one disk drive at a time, which of course limited the speed at which disks could be copied. The hardware of the CS3 replaced the power supply in the Apple. Since this high-capacity power supply was physically too large to fit within the Apple II, it was placed directly behind the Apple II and connected by means of a short cable. The CS3 with several drives could copy about 200 disks per hour (including a complete verification of each copy).

Both products included software tools for adjusting the disk drive's motor speed (a common problem on Apple's drives), software for more advanced maintenance, and detailed technical instructions on maintenance procedures. The CS3 also included a small circuit assembly which stabilized the Apple II's clock to allow one of the drive's maintenance adjustments to be performed without needing special drive exerciser equipment.

=== AD8088 Processor Card and AD128K Memory Card ===
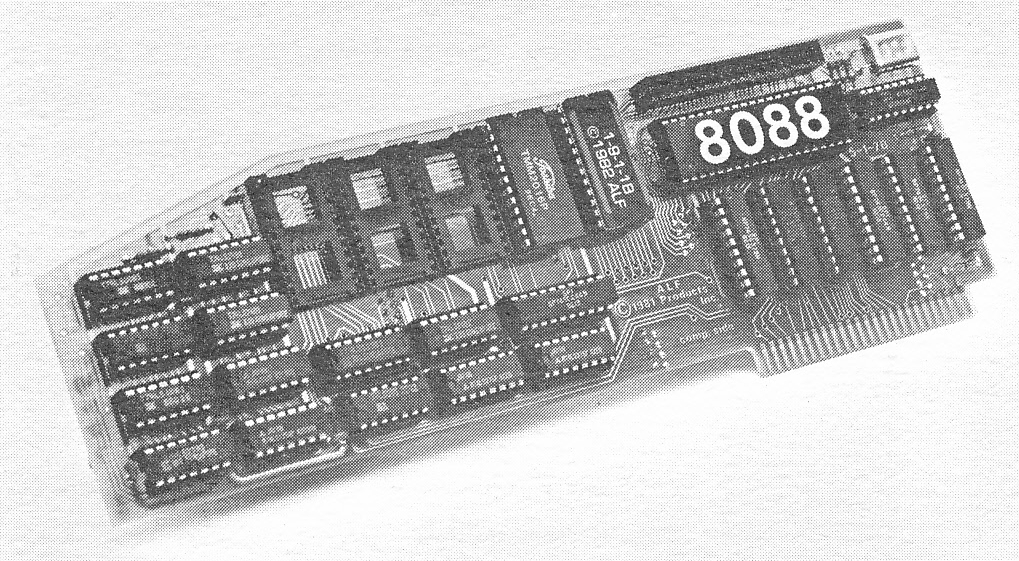
ALF's 8088 processor card for the Apple II

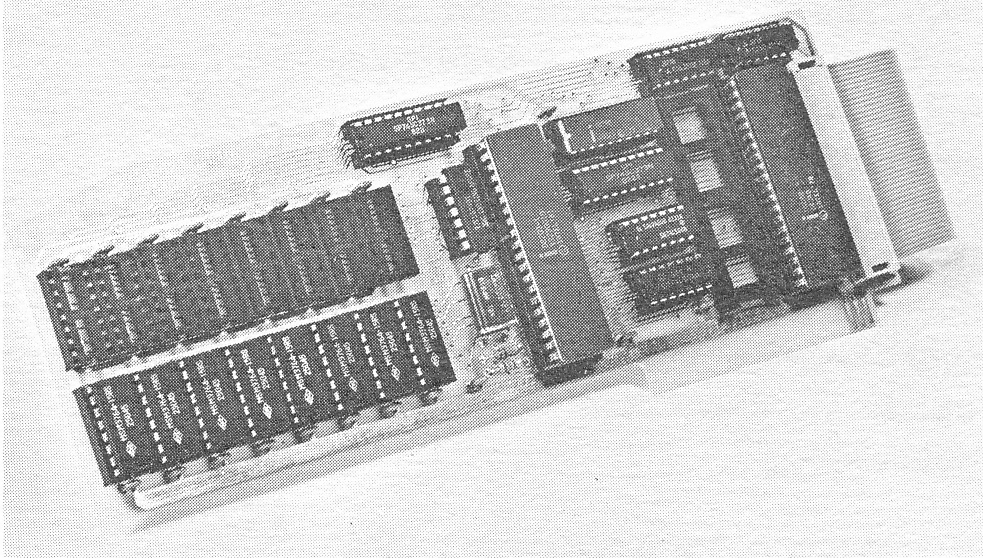
ALF's memory card for their AD8088 Processor Card

In June 1982, ALF began selling a card for the Apple II that added an Intel 8088 processor, the same processor as used in the IBM PC which had been introduced nine months earlier. Since the Apple II had only an 8-bit processor running at 1.023 MHz, ALF's AD8088 with its 16-bit processor running at 5 MHz allowed for much faster operations. An optional card, the AD128K, added up to 128K of memory for the 8088 (more than twice the memory available on the Apple II) and/or an Intel 8087 floating-point math coprocessor.

Much like Microsoft's Z-80 SoftCard, which allowed the Apple II to run software written for the Altair 8800 (or other S-100 computers) and operating systems such as CP/M, ALF's AD8088 allowed the Apple II to run software written for IBM's PC and operating systems such as CP/M-86 and MS-DOS. A version of CP/M-86 for the AD8088 was sold by Clone Software Corporation. Unlike the SoftCard and most other processor cards for the Apple II, ALF's AD8088 allowed the Apple's processor to operate simultaneously along with the AD8088's processor. The AD8088's processor could access the relatively slow memory in the Apple II, the fast memory on the AD8088 card itself (2K, 4K, 6K, or 8K bytes), and the fast memory on the accessory card (64K or 128K bytes). The AD8088 also had 4K bytes of ROM memory.

Three applications were included with the product: FTL, MET, and MEMDISK.

==== FTL ====
FTL, Formula Transfer Link, was an application that allowed floating-point math operations in Apple's Applesoft BASIC to be sent to the AD8088's 16-bit processor for evaluation rather than being evaluated by the Apple's 8-bit processor. This resulted in much faster execution and better accuracy. For even faster performance, math operations could be handled by the optional 8087 coprocessor. No modifications were needed to the user's Applesoft programs; FTL was activated simply by running an installation program after booting up the Apple II. FTL was also compatible with popular BASIC compilers (Microsoft TASC and On-Line Systems Expediter II).

A similar program, "The Pascal Patch", was sold by Micro Magic. It allowed the AD8088 to speed up math functions in Apple's Pascal programming language.

==== MET ====
MET, Multiple Event Timer, was an application that allowed the AD8088 to be used for software profiling or other precision timing functions. For profiling, the programmer would insert a write instruction to the AD8088 card (for example, using POKE in BASIC) at the beginning and end of each code section to be profiled, and execute the program. Next, a program supplied by ALF would be used to read the precise timing measurements stored in the AD8088's memory. This allowed the programmer to determine the amount of time each section took to execute, which is useful for determining which sections would benefit from optimization. MET could time intervals as short as 50 microseconds.

==== MEMDISK ====
Supplied with the AD128K, this application allowed the entire contents of a floppy disk (except the bootup tracks) to be read into the card's memory. The AD8088 could then be used directly by most software as if it were an Apple Disk II controller. The advantage of doing this is that the AD8088's solid-state memory is much faster than the mechanical rotating storage of a floppy diskette. The disadvantage is that any data changed on the memory-disk is lost if the power fails. Normally the user would write the memory-disk back to a floppy disk when finished making modifications.

=== CS5 Turbo / CS6 Turbo II diskette copiers ===
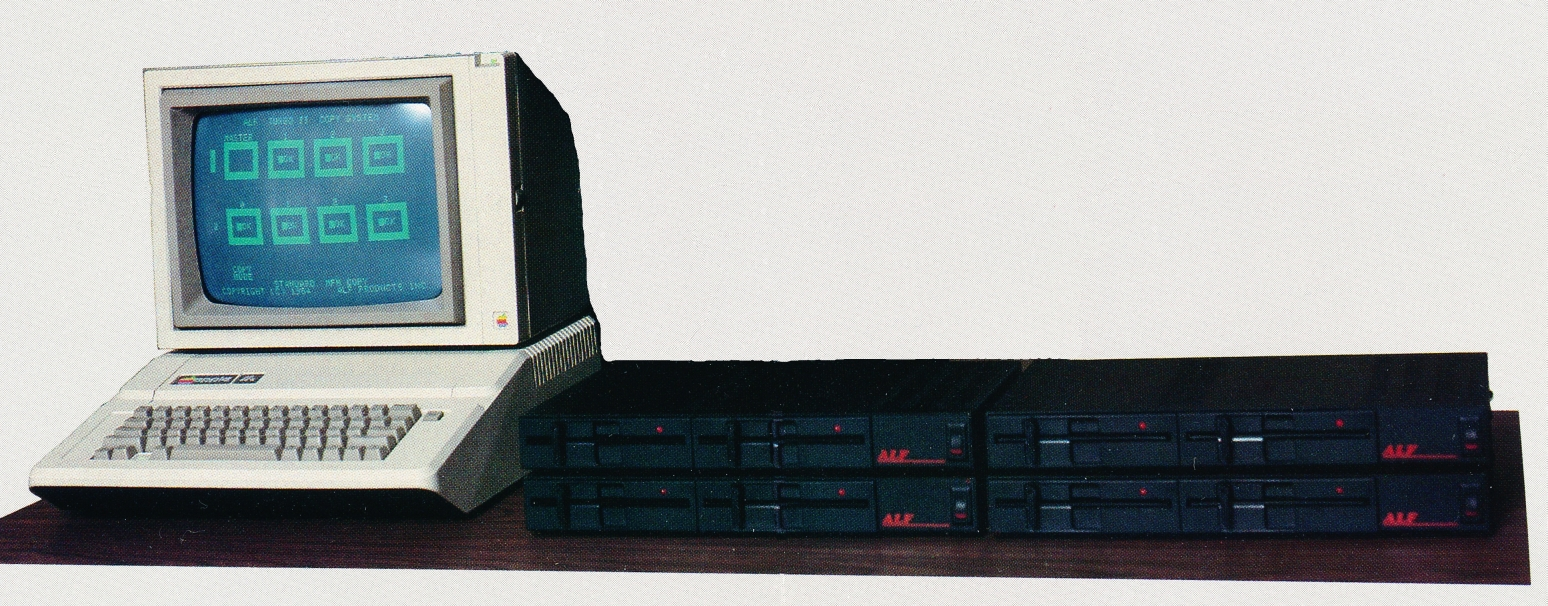
ALF's Turbo II disk copying system

The Turbo series of disk copiers used an Apple II computer but did not use any of Apple's disk hardware. Apple's hardware consisted of a controller card, plugged into an expansion slot, connected to one or two external drive units. Their external drive units used the computer's power supply, which could only handle one drive at a time. ALF's disk controller card similarly plugged inside the Apple, but connected to one or two pairs of drives; each pair had a dedicated power supply so all drives could be operated simultaneously. Two controller cards could be used to operate a total of eight drives. ALF's controller could read and write not only Apple's various disk formats, but formats for other brands of computers as well.

The CS5 Turbo system, introduced in 1984, could handle Apple, Atari, Commodore, and TRS-80 disk formats as well as most standard FM 5.25" formats. The CS6 Turbo II system, which used an upgraded controller card, added the popular IBM PC formats and most standard MFM 5.25" formats. This controller card, along with one of the dual-drive units, was also sold for use with the AD8088 Processor Card to allow CP/M-86 and MS-DOS users to read and write disks in both Apple II and IBM PC format; but most units were sold for disk copying purposes. With eight drives, a single Turbo II system could copy 319 Apple II or Commodore 64 disks, 283 Atari disks, 158 single-sided IBM PC or Atari Enhanced disks, 158 Kaypro or TRS-80 disks, or 86 double-sided IBM PC disks per hour (all including complete verification of each copy).

The CS6 Turbo II was also available in a version for use with automatic disk loaders, such as the Mountain Computer model 3200. When using an automatic loader, blank disks are fed from a stack in a hopper, rather than manually placed into drives one at a time. The loader has two output bins, one for good copies and one for defective disks. Each Turbo II system could operate one or two automatic loaders.

In addition to the standard 48 track-per-inch 5.25" drives, the CS6 was available in a version with 96 track-per-inch drives (quad density) for DEC Rainbow and Tandy 2000 formats. A 3.5" drive version could copy Amiga, Apple Macintosh and Unidisk, IBM PC Convertible, and other standard 3.5" formats.

=== Formatted disks ===
ALF obtained blank disks at very low prices due to the huge quantities needed for its disk copying service. ALF began selling blank disks in bulk packaging, instead of the usual ten-pack boxes, and with some advertising in the major personal computer magazines quickly became a major disk vendor. As competition in bulk disk sales began to increase, ALF looked for a way to distinguish its bulk disk products and soon hit upon the idea of selling pre-formatted disks. Normally, the user would have to format each disk before being able to use it in their computer, which was time-consuming. With pre-formatted disks, the user could use the disk in their computer immediately upon receipt. ALF, being a manufacturer of disk copying equipment, had a significant advantage in producing pre-formatted disks over most of the bulk disk vendors. Soon, ALF was formatting and selling millions of disks each year. ALF also formatted disks for some of the major disk manufacturers, such as Nashua Corporation

=== Quick Copy disk copiers ===
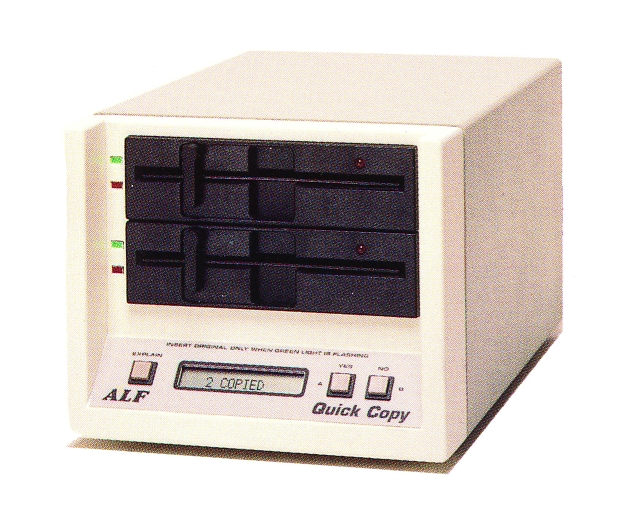
ALF's Quick Copy disk copier

The Quick Copy series was ALF's first copier line to have its own built-in computer, rather than requiring an Apple II computer to function. The first model was introduced in 1987, and copied only standard FM and MFM 5.25" disks (such as the IBM PC formats).

All the Quick Copy models had two disk drives, and were very easy to use. When the unit was first turned on, a green light next to the upper drive flashed, indicating the user should insert the "master disk" (the disk the user wants to copy). While the Quick Copy read the master disk into memory, the user could place a blank disk into the lower drive, and the unit would automatically begin making the first copy. When the unit was finished reading the master disk, the green light would go on, indicating the master disk was read into memory OK (or, a red light next to the upper drive would indicate a problem reading the master). The master disk could then be removed, and the user could insert a blank disk. As each copy was finished, in either the upper or lower drive, the unit indicated a good copy with a green light or a defective copy with a red light. The user could simply continue removing all the good copies and inserting new blank disks in each drive to make as many copies as desired. While the user was removing a finished disk and inserting a blank disk in one drive, the other drive could be in the process of copying; unlike systems where the two drives had to be synchronized.

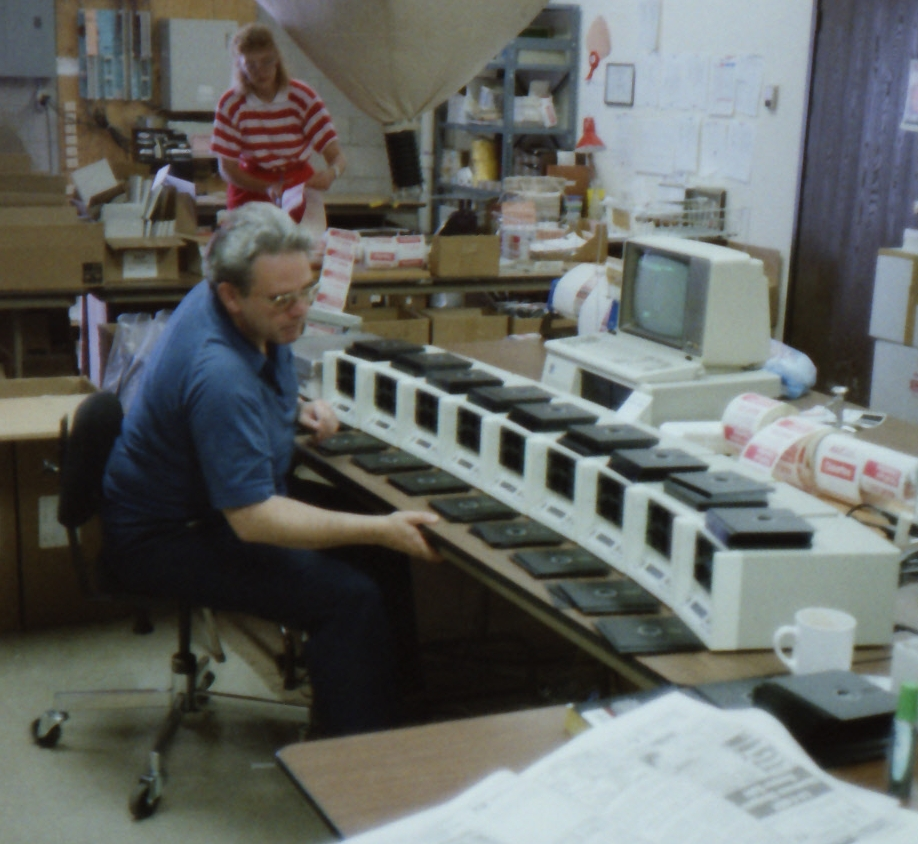
An ALF employee operates nine Quick Copy duplicators.

A small LCD showed the number of disks copied, and two "count downs" to show the progress of each drive. The display could also show various menu selections when not copying. Two buttons to the right of the display allowed the user to cycle through and select menu items, and a button to the left of the display could be held to scroll instructions for each menu item across the display. For large volume copying, multiple units could be placed side by side. A single user could operate them and make about 2000 copies per hour.

Starting in 1988, ALF began introducing a number of 800-series models of Quick Copys. Externally, the 800-series models looked the same as the 701 model, but internally the controlling electronics were completely different. Models were available with various 5.25" or 3.5" drives; together, the various models could copy virtually every disk format in use by any personal computer. In the final model (model 832), introduced in 1992, each of the two drives contained both a 5.25" drive and a 3.5" drive; the user could use either the two 5.25" drives or the two 3.5" drives and thus copy a wide variety of disk formats.

=== 100-Series autoloader controllers ===
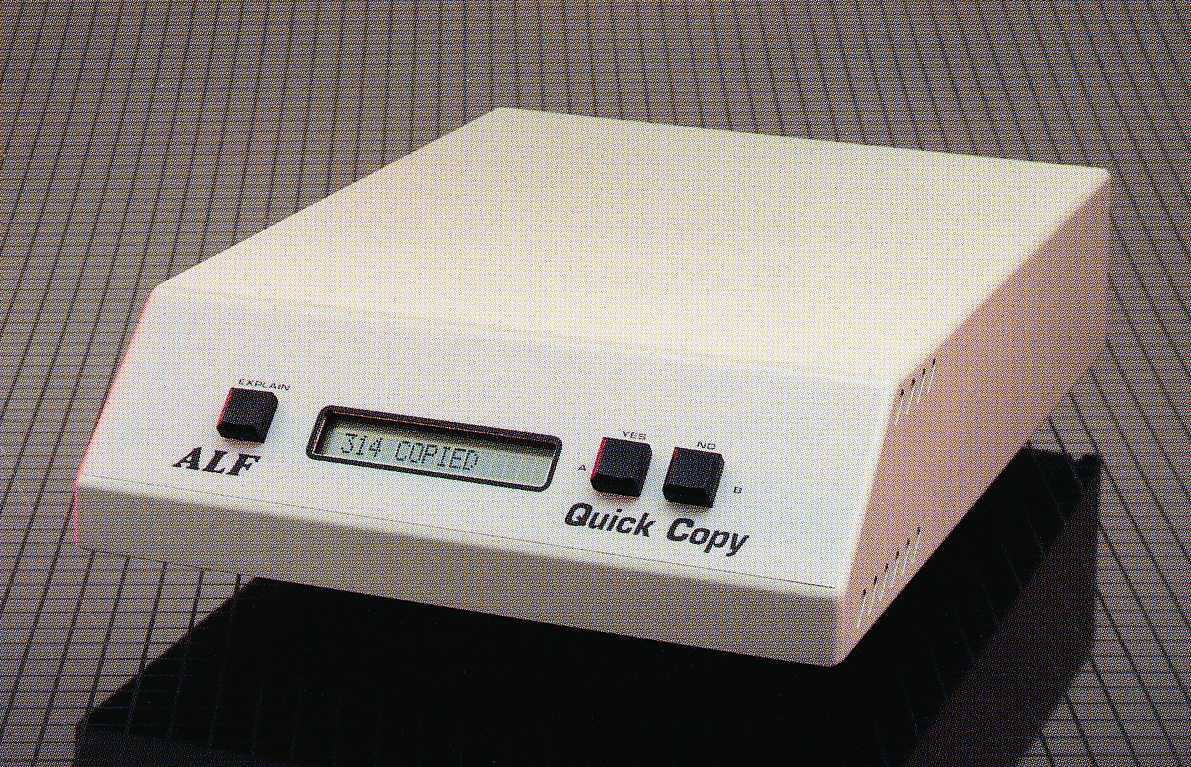
ALF's 100-Series autoloader controller

In 1989, ALF used the electronics of the 800-series to create the 100-series of copying controllers for automatic loaders. Each 100-series unit operated a single automatic loader, but it could copy both sides of a double-sided disk simultaneously (all of ALF's earlier copiers, and all drives used in computers, could only read or write to one side of the disk at any given moment) and could handle drives that spin twice as fast as normal. Virtually every manufacturer of automatic loaders in the U.S. offered at least one product using ALF's 100-series (companies included Ashby Industries, CopyMaster, Costas Systems, MissionSix, Rimage Corporation, Trace Corporation, and Victory Enterprises). Most built the 100-series electronics directly inside their loader, but ALF also offered a compact metal enclosure that could be located on top of the loader or nearby.

=== Pro-Series autoloader controllers ===
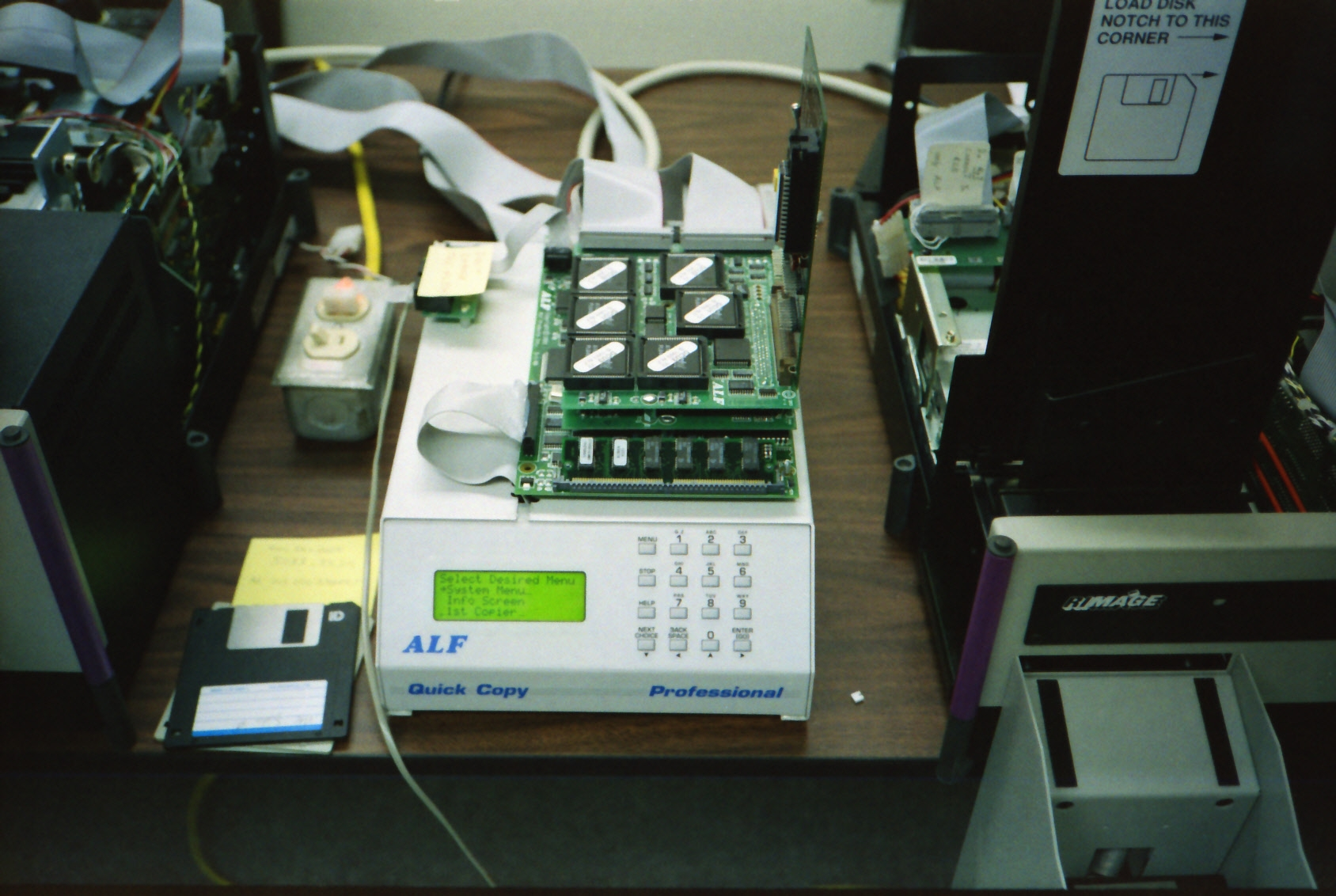
Pro-Series prototype unit undergoing tests. Circuit cards sitting on top of the unit normally mount inside.

By the 1990s, there were many large disk-copying services, and most of these already had ample installations of copying equipment (purchased from ALF and from other manufacturers). It was also becoming clear that floppy disks were going to be replaced by other media. ALF decided to design the next generation of automatic loader controllers, the Pro-Series, to be a very powerful design that could handle large numbers of automatic loaders with the latest high-speed simultaneous-double-side drives but at a very low cost per capability. The assumption was copying services would be adding equipment only as needed to replace existing equipment as it wore out. The days of massive expansion in production were over, and they would be looking for very low-cost products.

The Pro-Series was designed so a single controller could handle eight automatic loaders, each with a very high speed drive. Additionally, multiple units could easily be connected with an Ethernet-like twisted-pair cable so that one unit could load the master for use by hundreds of units, and the hundreds of units could all be controlled from one unit's keyboard and display. The use of large-scale gate arrays, which could later be converted to application-specific integrated circuits if sales volumes permitted, allowed all the features and speed of the highest-cost copying equipment to be included in a relatively inexpensive circuit board.

Most of the design work for the Pro-Series was done prior to ALF being acquired by Rimage Corporation in October 1993. The design was completed at Rimage by former ALF employees after the acquisition.
