= Forterra Systems =

3D graphics software company headquartered in San Mateo, California

Forterra Systems, Inc.
- Industry: 3D graphics software
- Founded: 1998; 28 years ago
- Headquarters: San Mateo, California
- Products: Massively multiplayer online game (MMOG)

Forterra Systems, Inc. was a 3D graphics software company headquartered in San Mateo, California that produced private and secure massively multiplayer online game (MMOG) virtual worlds for corporate, government, defense, medical and educational clients. Forterra Systems also shared a close history with the MMOG There. On February 1, 2010, Science Applications International Corporation (SAIC) announced its acquisition of the company's simulation & collaboration product line, including all names, trademarks and licenses.

Founded in 1998 as There, Inc., Forterra Systems built private and secure distributed virtual worlds using their OLIVE (On-Line Interactive Virtual Environment) technology platform and industry-standard PC server and client hardware. OLIVE virtual environments typically are deployed within a client's existing IT and network security systems. Optionally, OLIVE could be hosted externally by Forterra, depending upon the customer's preferences.

== On-Line Interactive Virtual Environment ==
On-Line Interactive Virtual Environment (OLIVE) customers rapidly generate realistic, three-dimensional virtual environments that scale from single user applications to large-scale simulated environments that support a vast number of concurrent users.

The virtual worlds produced or hosted by Forterra Systems and their clients appear to function similarly to public, open-invitation MMOGs (e.g., There, Second Life, Active Worlds). OLIVE environments differ from consumer-based MMOGs in that access to the virtual world is privately managed, and granted only to specific groups of users. OLIVE applications typically focus on employee or staff training, and secure collaborative business decision-making, for example, rather than focusing on entertainment or broadly defined social networking purposes.

Another difference between conventional MMO virtual environments and OLIVE environments is that real-world locations are replicated in an OLIVE virtual world, as opposed to fantasy-based worlds or hypothetical "islands".

There is based on shared technology with Forterra Systems that was initially developed in conjunction with a US Army project. The There service was spun off to Makena Technologies in 2005. There's operations remained uninterrupted during the various corporate changes. Since then, two additional instances of There have been created, both owned and administered by Makena Technologies.
