= Apple II =

1977–1993 series of microcomputers

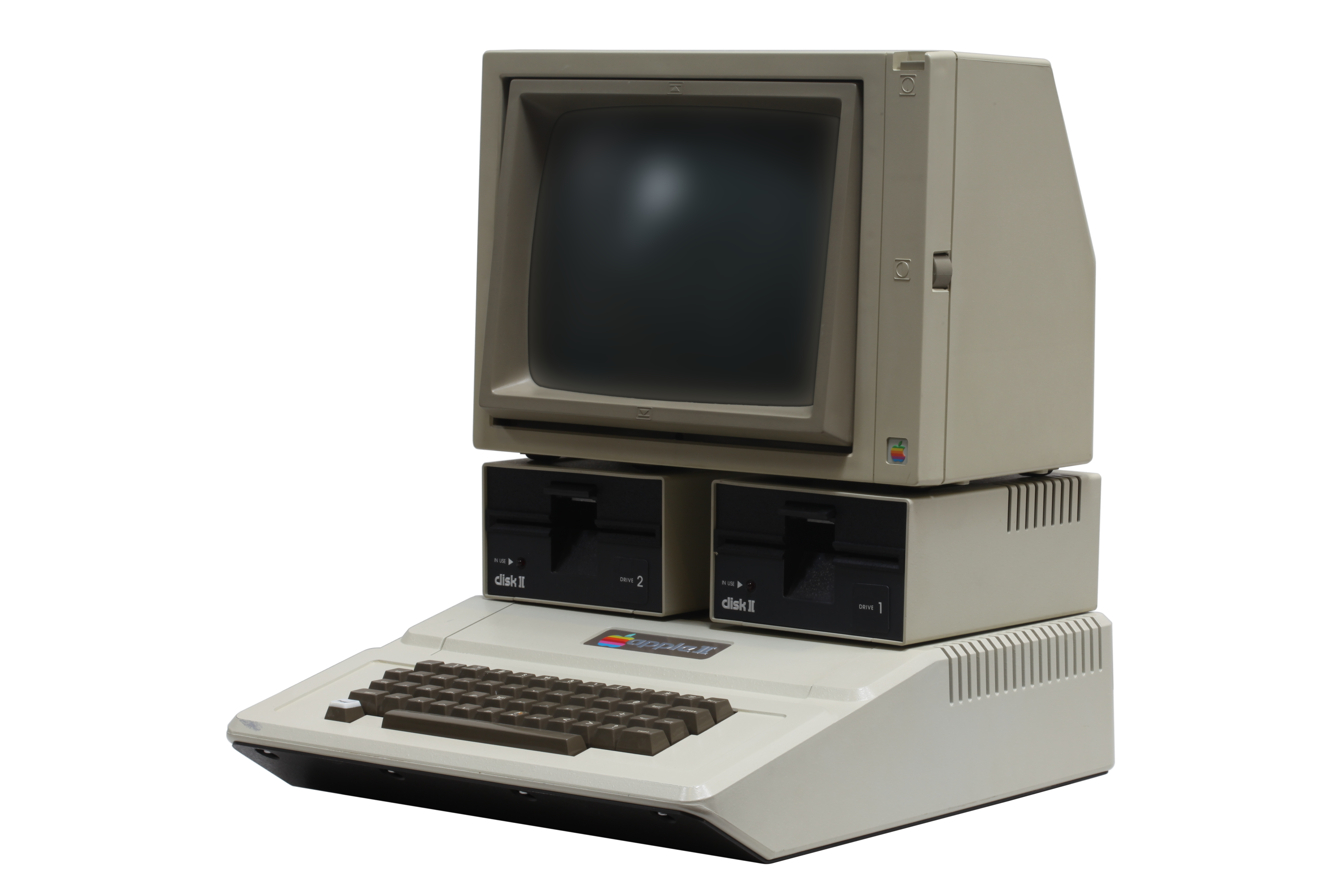
- 1977 Apple II shown with two Disk II floppy drives and a 1980s-era Monitor II
- Developer: Steve Wozniak (original lead designer)
- Manufacturer: Apple Computer, Inc.
- Released: June 1977; 49 years ago (original Apple II)
- Discontinued: October 1993; 33 years ago
- Units sold: 6 million
- Operating system: Apple DOS; Apple ProDOS; Apple Pascal; Apple GS/OS
- CPU: II, II+ & IIe: 6502 @ 1.023 MHz; Enhanced IIe, IIc, IIc+ & IIe Card: 65C02 @ 1.023 MHz (Note: The Apple IIc Plus could be configured to operate at 4 MHz. The Apple IIe Card could be configured to operate at 2.046 MHz.); IIGS: 65C816 @ 2.8 MHz
- Storage: Compact Cassette; 5 1/4-inch 140 KB Disk II floppy disk (optional); 3 1/2-inch 800K floppy disk (optional)
- Display: NTSC video out (built-in RCA connector)
- Sound: 1-bit speaker (built-in)
- Predecessor: Apple I
- Successor: Apple III (intended); Mac

The Apple II is a series of microcomputers manufactured by Apple Computer, Inc. from 1977 to 1993. The original model, designed by Steve Wozniak, first went on sale on June 10, 1977. The series included the Apple II Plus, Apple IIe, Apple IIc, Apple IIc Plus, and Apple IIGS. The IIe was the series' best-selling model. The Apple II name was stylized as the apple ][ on early models and as the Apple // beginning with the IIe in 1983.

Alongside the Commodore PET 2001 and the TRS-80, the Apple II was one of the computers commonly grouped as the "1977 Trinity", which helped establish the home computer market. Compared with the bare motherboard of the Apple I, it offered a complete system in a plastic case with a built-in keyboard, color graphics, and an open architecture. Apple marketed the computer to educational institutions and businesses, and the development of software for the platform, including the 1979 release of the VisiCalc spreadsheet, helped expand its use in schools, businesses, and homes.

Early Apple II models used the 8-bit MOS Technology 6502 processor, while later models used the compatible but improved WDC 65C02. The computers supported text and color graphics and featured a software-controlled speaker for single-channel sound. Introduced in 1986, the Apple IIGS used a 16-bit WDC 65C816 processor, enhanced graphics, and more advanced sound capabilities. Although largely backwards compatible with earlier Apple II software and hardware, the IIGS also shared features with contemporary 16-bit computers such as the Atari ST and Amiga.

Despite the introduction of the Macintosh in 1984, the Apple II series accounted for a larger share of Apple's sales until 1987. Apple continued selling Apple II computers alongside the Macintosh until discontinuing the Apple IIe in November 1993. The Apple IIe Card, which enabled Macintosh computers to run Apple IIe software, was discontinued in May 1995. Apple sold approximately six million Apple II computers during the series' production run, including about 1.25 million IIGS units. Sales peaked in 1983, when the company sold about one million units.

== Hardware ==
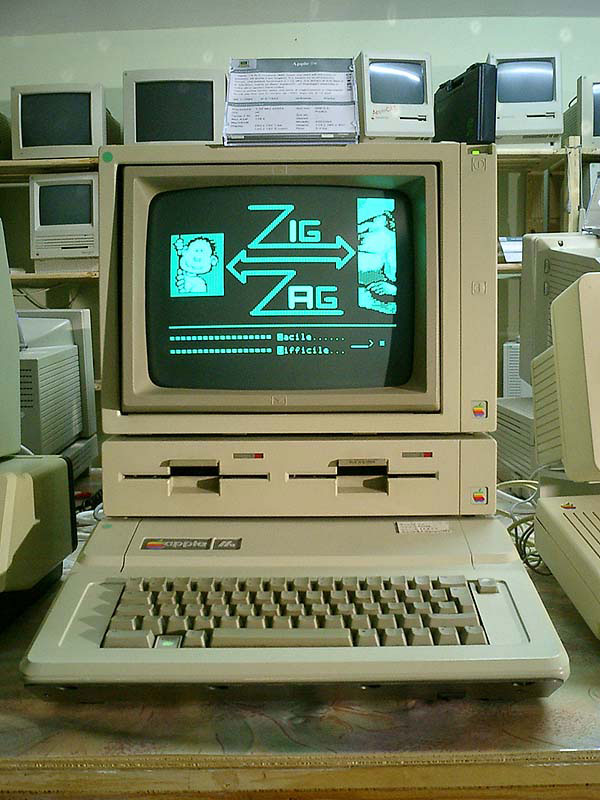
Apple IIe with DuoDisk and Monitor II

Unlike preceding home microcomputers, the Apple II was sold as a finished consumer appliance rather than as a kit (unassembled or preassembled). Apple marketed the Apple II as a durable product, including a 1981 ad in which an Apple II survived a fire started when a cat belonging to one early user knocked over a lamp.

All the machines in the series, except the IIc, share similar overall design elements. The plastic case was designed to look more like a home appliance than a piece of electronic equipment, and the case can be opened without the use of tools. All models in the Apple II series have a built-in keyboard, with the exception of the IIGS which has a separate keyboard.

The Apple II has color and high-resolution graphics modes, sound capabilities and a built-in BASIC programming language. The motherboard holds eight expansion slots and an array of random access memory (RAM) sockets that can hold up to 48 kilobytes. Over the course of the Apple II series' life, an enormous amount of first- and third-party hardware was made available to extend the capabilities of the machine. The IIc was designed as a compact, portable unit, not intended to be disassembled, and cannot use most of the expansion hardware sold for the other machines in the series.

== Software ==
The original Apple II has the operating system in ROM along with a BASIC variant called Integer BASIC. Apple eventually released Applesoft BASIC, a more advanced variant of the language which users can run instead of Integer BASIC. The Apple II series eventually supported over 1,500 software programs.

When the Disk II floppy disk drive was released in 1978, a new operating system, Apple DOS, was commissioned from Shepardson Microsystems and developed by Paul Laughton, adding support for the disk drive. The final version of this software was Apple DOS 3.3.

Apple DOS was superseded by ProDOS, which supported a hierarchical file system and larger storage devices. With an optional third-party Z80-based expansion card, the Apple II could boot into the CP/M operating system and run WordStar, dBase II, and other CP/M software. With the release of MousePaint in 1984 and the Apple IIGS in 1986, the platform took on the look of the Macintosh user interface, including a mouse.

Much commercial Apple II software shipped on self-booting disks and does not use standard DOS disk formats. This discouraged the copying or modifying of the software on the disks, and improved loading speed.

== Models ==
=== Apple II ===
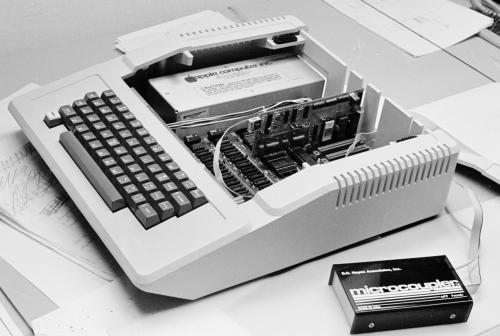
An Apple II computer with an internal modem and external DAA

The first Apple II computers went on sale on June 10, 1977, with a MOS Technology 6502 (later Synertek) microprocessor running at 1.023 MHz, 4 KB of RAM, an audio cassette interface for loading programs and storing data, and the Integer BASIC programming language built into the ROMs. The video controller displayed 40 columns by 24 lines of monochrome, upper-case–only (the original character set matches ASCII characters 0x20 to 0x5F) text on the screen, with NTSC composite video output suitable for display on a TV monitor, or on a regular TV set by way of a separate RF modulator. The original retail price of the computer was US$1,298 (equivalent to $6,900 in 2025) with 4 KB of RAM and US$2,638 (equivalent to $14,000 in 2025) with the maximum 48 KB of RAM. To reflect the computer's color graphics capability, the Apple logo on the casing was represented using rainbow stripes, which remained a part of Apple's corporate logo until early 1998. The earliest Apple IIs were assembled in Silicon Valley, and later in Texas; printed circuit boards were manufactured in Ireland and Singapore.

An external 5 1/4-inch floppy disk drive, the Disk II, attached via a controller card that plugged into one of the computer's expansion slots (usually slot 6), was used for data storage and retrieval to replace cassettes. The Disk II interface, created by Steve Wozniak, was regarded as an engineering masterpiece for its economy of electronic components.

Rather than having a dedicated sound-synthesis chip, the Apple II had a toggle circuit that could only emit a click through a built-in speaker; all other sounds (including two, three and, eventually, four-voice music and playback of audio samples and speech synthesis) were generated entirely by software that clicked the speaker at just the right times.

The Apple II's multiple expansion slots permitted a wide variety of third-party devices, including Apple II peripheral cards such as serial controllers, display controllers, memory boards, hard disks, networking components, and real-time clocks. There were plug-in expansion cards – such as the Z-80 SoftCard – that permitted the Apple to use the Z80 processor and run a multitude of programs developed under the CP/M operating system, including the dBase II database and the WordStar word processor. There was also a third-party 6809 card that would allow OS-9 Level One to be run. Third-party sound cards greatly improved audio capabilities, allowing simple music synthesis and text-to-speech functions. Eventually, Apple II accelerator cards were created to double or quadruple the computer's speed.

Rod Holt designed the Apple II's power supply. He employed a switched-mode power supply design, which was far smaller and generated less unwanted heat than the linear power supply some other home computers used.

The original Apple II was discontinued at the start of 1981; it was superseded by the Apple II+.

=== Apple II Plus ===
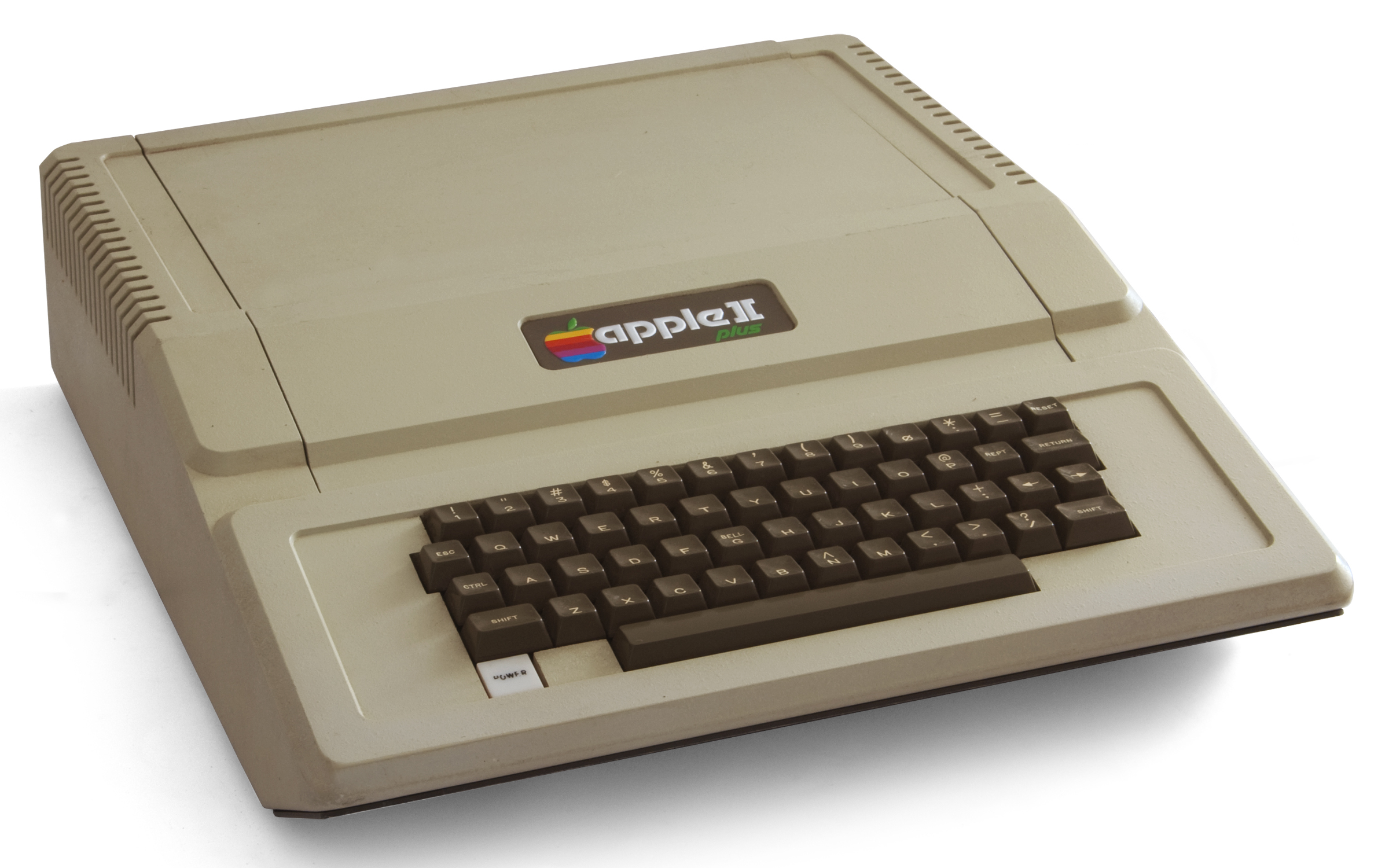
Apple II Plus

The Apple II Plus, introduced in June 1979, includes the Applesoft BASIC programming language in ROM. This Microsoft-authored dialect of BASIC, previously available as an upgrade, supports floating-point arithmetic, and became the standard BASIC dialect on the Apple II series (though it runs at a noticeably slower speed than Steve Wozniak's Integer BASIC).

Except for improved graphics and disk-booting support in the ROM, and the removal of the 2k 6502 assembler to make room for the floating point BASIC, the II+ was otherwise identical to the original II. There are small differences in the physical appearance and keyboard. RAM prices fell during 1980–81 and all II Plus machines came with a full 48 KB of memory already installed.

==== Apple II Europlus and J-Plus ====
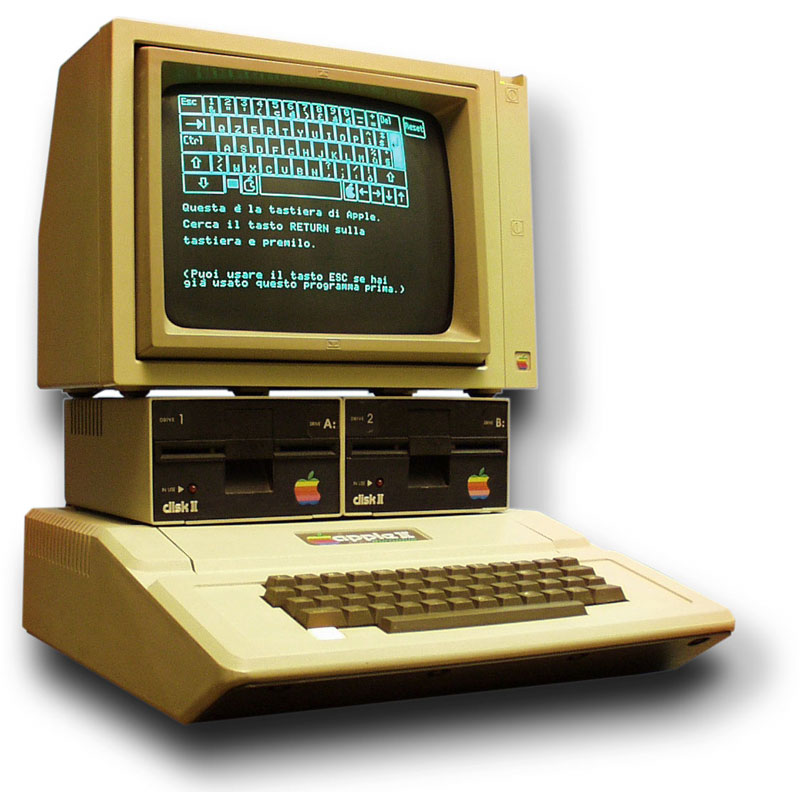
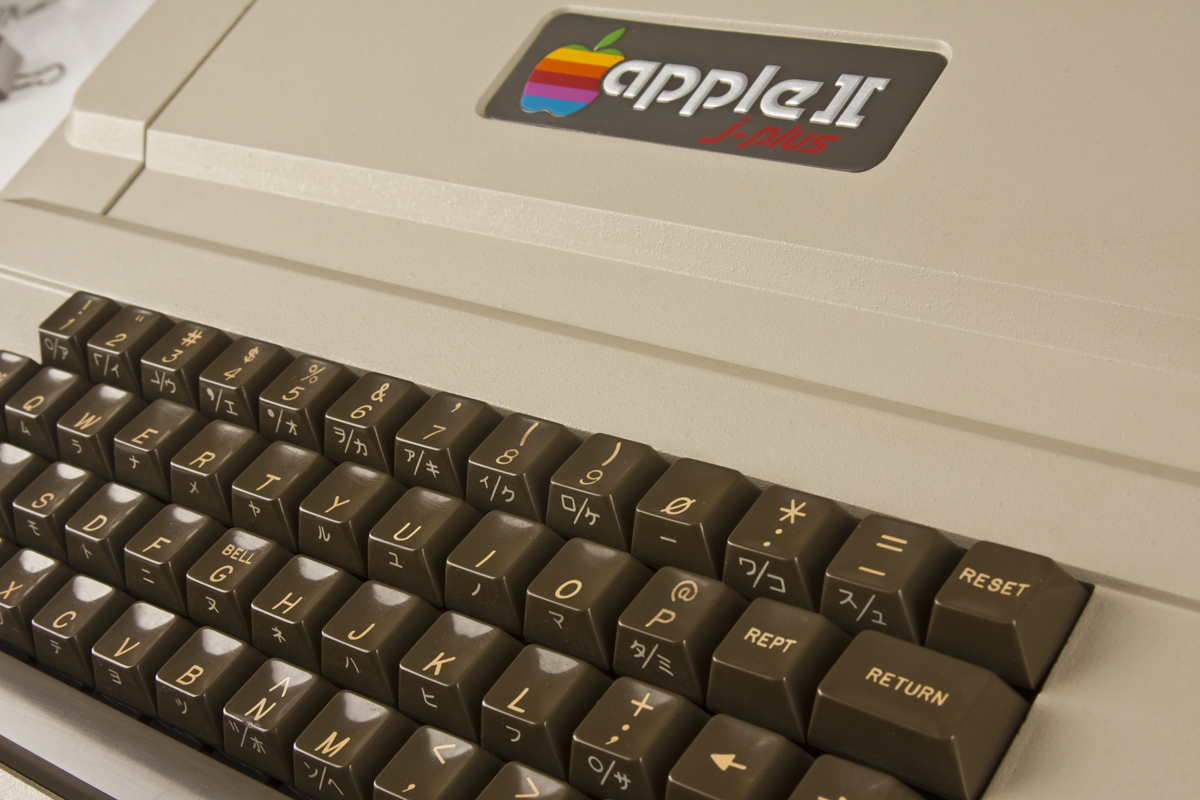
Apple II Europlus (left) and Apple II J-Plus (right)

After the success of the first Apple II in the United States, Apple expanded its market to include Europe, the Middle East, Australia and the Far East in 1979, with the Apple II Europlus (Europe, Australia) and the Apple II J-Plus (Japan). In these models, Apple made the necessary hardware, software and firmware changes in order to comply to standards outside of the US.

=== Apple IIe ===
The Apple II Plus was followed in 1983 by the Apple IIe, a cost-reduced yet more powerful machine using newer chips to reduce the component count and add new features, such as the display of upper and lowercase letters and a standard 64 KB of RAM.

The IIe RAM is configured as if it were a 48 KB Apple II Plus with a language card. The machine has no slot 0, but instead has an auxiliary slot that can accept a 1 KB memory card to enable the 80-column display. This card contains only RAM; the hardware and firmware for the 80-column display is built into the Apple IIe. An "extended 80-column card" with more memory increased the machine's RAM to 128 KB.

The Apple IIe was the most popular machine in the Apple II series. It is the longest-lived Apple computer of all time; it was manufactured with only minor changes for nearly 11 years. The IIe was the last Apple II model to be sold, and it was discontinued in November 1993. During its lifespan two variations were introduced: the Apple IIe Enhanced (four replacement chips to give it some of the features of the later Apple IIc) and the Apple IIe Platinum (a modernized case color to match other Apple products of the era, along with the addition of a numeric keypad).

Some of the features of the IIe were carried over from the less successful Apple III, including the ProDOS operating system.

=== Apple IIc ===
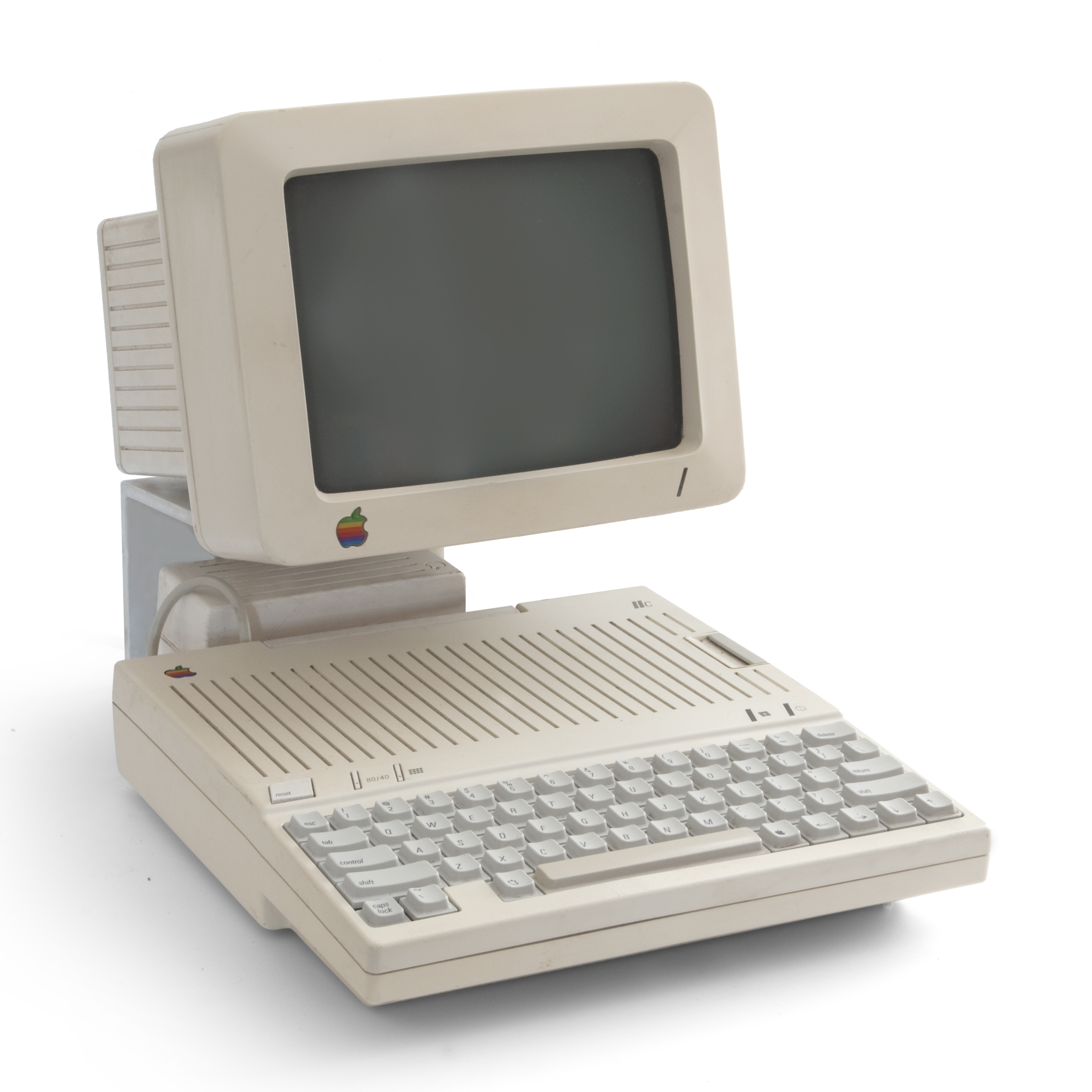
The Apple IIc was Apple's first compact and portable computer.

The Apple IIc was released in April 1984, billed as a portable Apple II because it could be easily carried due to its size and carrying handle, which could be flipped down to prop the machine up into a typing position. Unlike modern portables, it lacked a built-in display and battery. It was the first of three Apple II models to be made in the Snow White design language, and the only one that used its unique creamy off-white color.

The Apple IIc was the first Apple II to use the 65C02 low-power variant of the 6502 processor, and featured a built-in 5 1/4-inch floppy drive and 128 KB RAM, with a built-in disk controller that could control external drives, composite video (NTSC or PAL), serial interfaces for modem and printer, and a port usable by either a joystick or mouse. Unlike previous Apple II models, the IIc had no internal expansion slots at all.

Two different monochrome LC displays were sold for use with the IIc's video expansion port, although both were short-lived due to high cost and poor legibility. The IIc had an external power supply that converted AC power to 15 V DC, though the IIc itself will accept between 12 V and 17 V DC, allowing third parties to offer battery packs and automobile power adapters that connected in place of the supplied AC adapter.

=== Apple IIGS ===
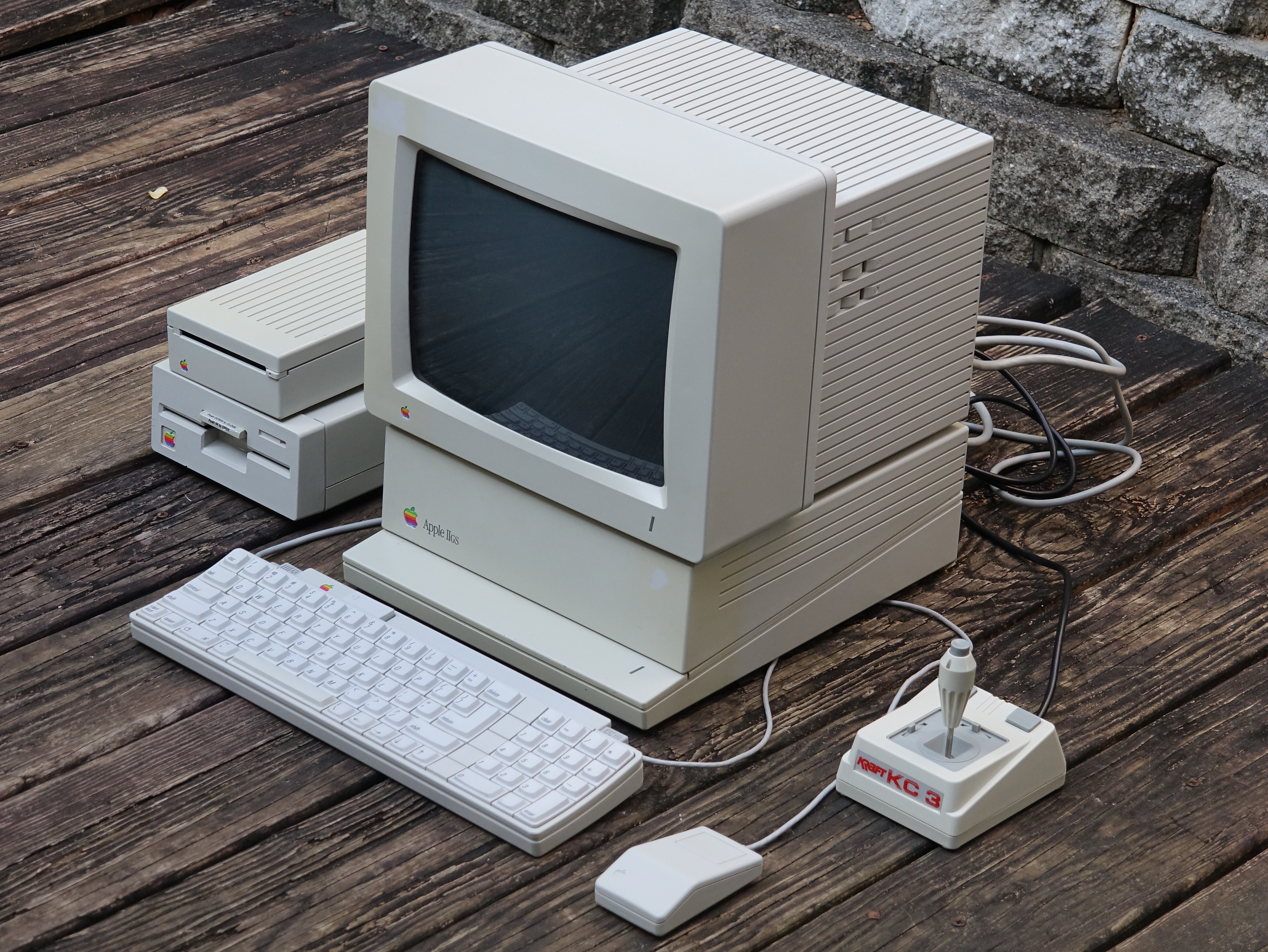
Apple IIGS with monitor, keyboard, mouse, joystick, 3 1/2-inch floppy disk drive and 5 1/4-inch floppy disk drive

The Apple IIGS, released on September 15, 1986, is the penultimate and most advanced model in the Apple II series, and a radical departure from prior models. It uses a 16-bit microprocessor, the 65C816 operating at 2.8 MHz with 24-bit addressing, allowing expansion up to 8 MB of RAM. The graphics are significantly improved, with 4096 colors and new modes with resolutions of 320×200 and 640×400. The audio capabilities are vastly improved, with a built-in music synthesizer that far exceeded any other home computer.

The Apple IIGS evolved the platform while still maintaining near-complete backward compatibility. Its Mega II chip contains the functional equivalent of an entire Apple IIe computer (sans processor). This, combined with the 65816's ability to execute 65C02 code directly, provides full support for legacy software, while also supporting 16-bit software running under a new OS.

The OS eventually included a Macintosh-like graphical Finder for managing disks and files and opening documents and applications, along with desk accessories. Later, the IIGS gained the ability to read and write Macintosh disks and, through third-party software, a multitasking Unix-like shell and TrueType font support.

The GS includes a 32-voice Ensoniq 5503 DOC sample-based sound synthesizer chip with 64 KB dedicated RAM, 256 KB (or later 1.125 MB) of standard RAM, built-in peripheral ports (switchable between IIe-style card slots and IIc-style onboard controllers for disk drives, mouse, RGB video, and serial devices), and built-in AppleTalk networking.

=== Apple IIc Plus ===
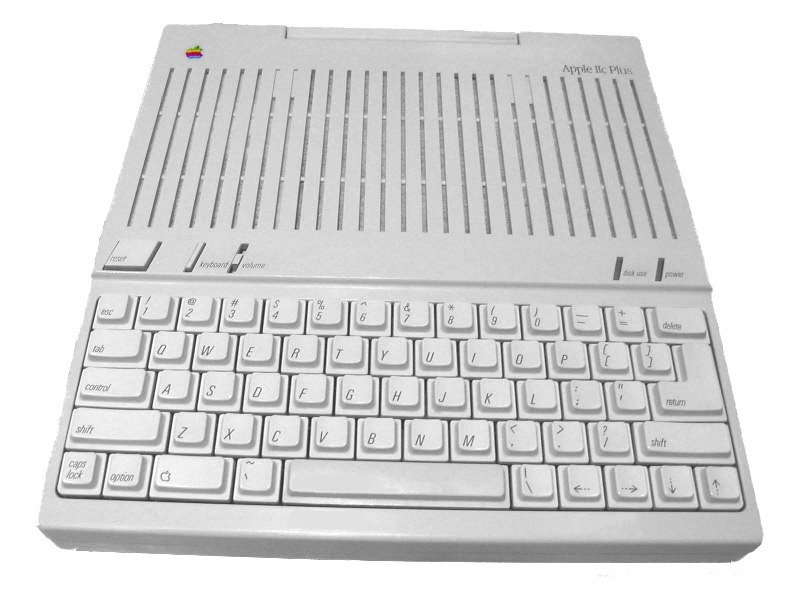
The Apple IIc Plus, an enhancement of the original portable with faster CPU, 3 1/2-inch floppy, and built-in power supply. It was the last model in the Apple II line.

The final Apple II model was the Apple IIc Plus introduced in 1988. It was the same size and shape as the IIc that came before it, but the 5 1/4-inch floppy drive had been replaced with a 3 1/2-inch drive, the power supply was moved inside the case, and the processor was a fast 4 MHz 65C02 processor that actually ran 8-bit Apple II software faster than the IIGS.

The IIc Plus also featured a new keyboard layout that matched the Platinum IIe and IIGS. Unlike the IIe IIc and IIGS, the IIc Plus came only in one version (American) and was not officially sold anywhere outside the US. The Apple IIc Plus ceased production in 1990, with its two-year production run being the shortest of all the Apple II computers.

=== Apple IIe Card ===
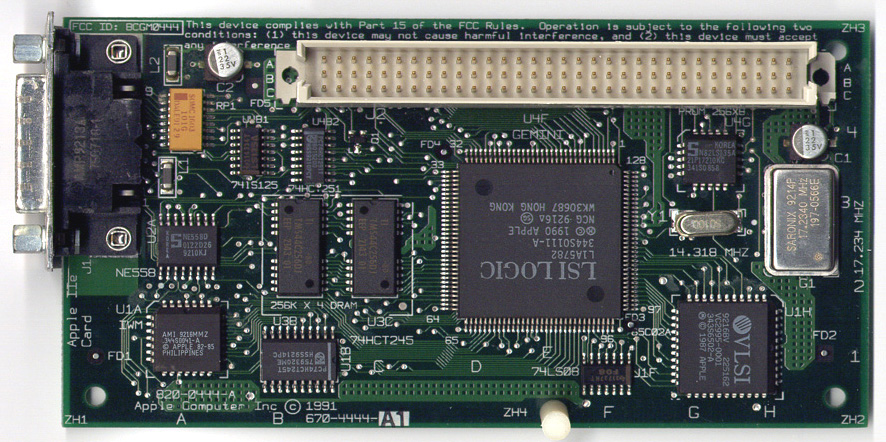
Apple IIe Card

The Apple IIe Card, released in 1991, was an expansion card for the Macintosh LC. Using a variant of the Mega II chip from the IIGS, it implemented much of the hardware of an IIe, allowing the Macintosh to run Apple II software. Users could configure the card to run at approximately twice the speed of a standard IIe. However, the card emulated video output in software, which could reduce performance when programs made frequent screen updates.

A breakout cable connected to the card allowed users to attach up to two UniDisk or Apple 5.25 Drives, one UniDisk 3.5 drive, and an Apple II joystick. In Apple II mode, the card could also use several of the Macintosh LC's built-in resources, including its memory, internal 3 1/2-inch floppy drive, AppleTalk networking, serial ports, mouse, and real-time clock. It could access hard disk partitions formatted with ProDOS. The card could not run software designed specifically for the 16-bit Apple IIGS.

== Advertising, marketing, and packaging ==
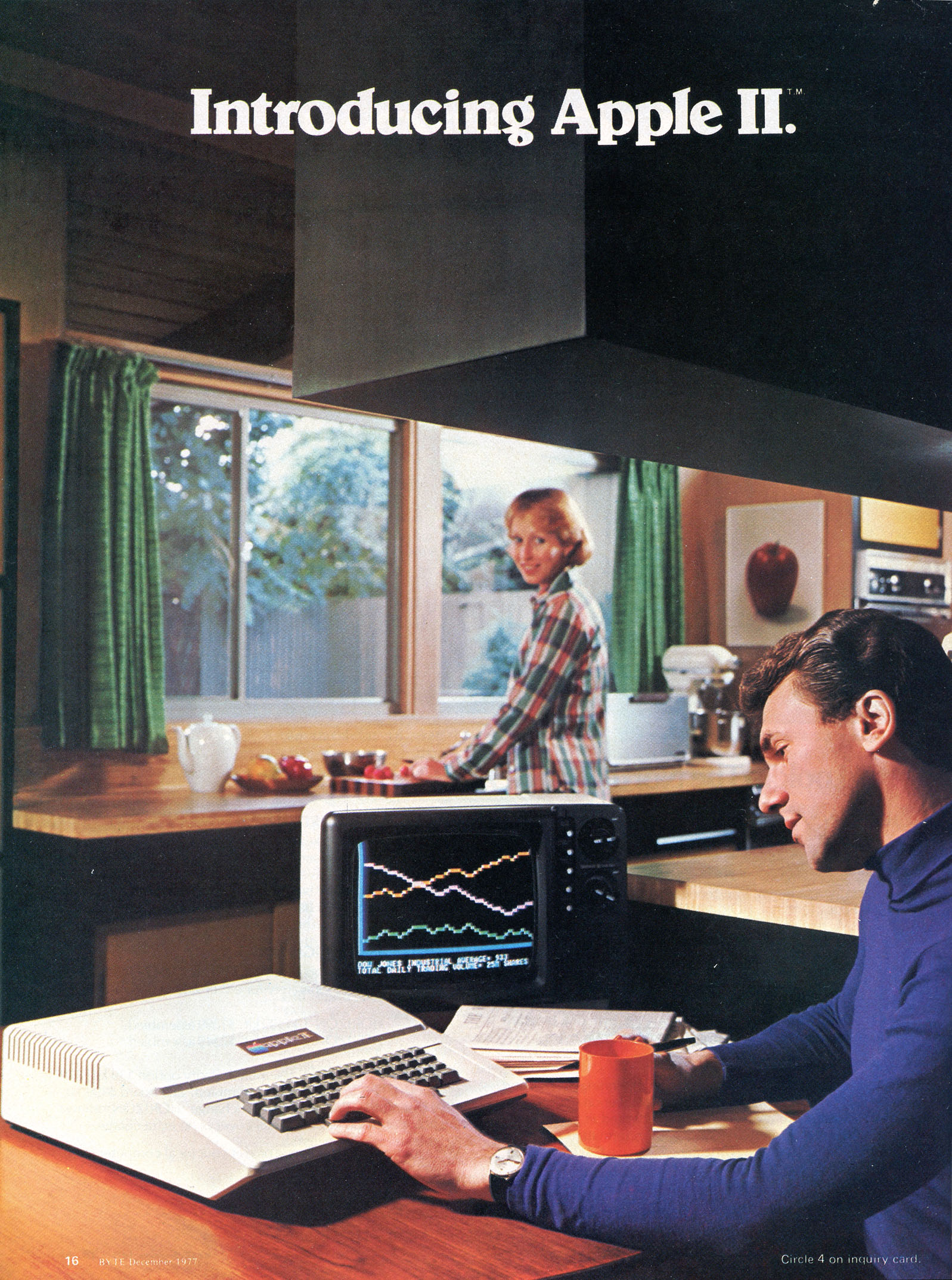
A 1977 Byte magazine advertisement for the original Apple II

Mike Markkula, a retired Intel marketing manager, provided the early critical funding for Apple Computer. From 1977 to 1981, Apple used the Regis McKenna agency for its advertisements and marketing. In 1981, Chiat-Day acquired Regis McKenna's advertising operations and Apple used Chiat-Day. At Regis McKenna Advertising, the team assigned to launch the Apple II consisted of Rob Janoff, art director, Chip Schafer, copywriter and Bill Kelley, account executive. Janoff came up with the Apple logo with a bite out of it. The design was originally an olive green with matching company logotype all in lowercase. Steve Jobs insisted on promoting the color capability of the Apple II by putting rainbow stripes on the Apple logo. In its letterhead and business card implementation, the rounded "a" of the logotype echoed the "bite" in the logo. This logo was developed simultaneously with an advertisement and a brochure; the latter being produced for distribution initially at the first West Coast Computer Faire.

Since the original Apple II, Apple has paid high attention to its quality of packaging, partly because of Steve Jobs' personal preferences and opinions on packaging and final product appearance. All of Apple's packaging for the Apple II series looked similar, featuring much clean white space and showing the Apple rainbow logo prominently. For several years up until the late 1980s, Apple used the Motter Tektura font for packaging, until changing to the Apple Garamond font.

Apple ran the first advertisement for the Apple II, a two-page spread ad titled "Introducing Apple II", in BYTE in July 1977. The first brochure, was entitled "Simplicity" and the copy in both the ad and brochure pioneered "demystifying" language intended to make the new idea of a home computer more "personal". The Apple II introduction ad was later run in the September 1977 issue of Scientific American.

Apple later aired eight television commercials for the Apple IIGS, emphasizing its benefits to education and students, along with some print ads.

== Clones ==
The Apple II was frequently cloned, both in the United States and abroad, in a similar way to the IBM PC. According to some sources (see below), more than 190 different models of Apple II clones were manufactured. Most could not be legally imported into the United States. Apple sued and sought criminal charges against clone makers in more than a dozen countries.

== Data storage ==
=== Compact cassette ===
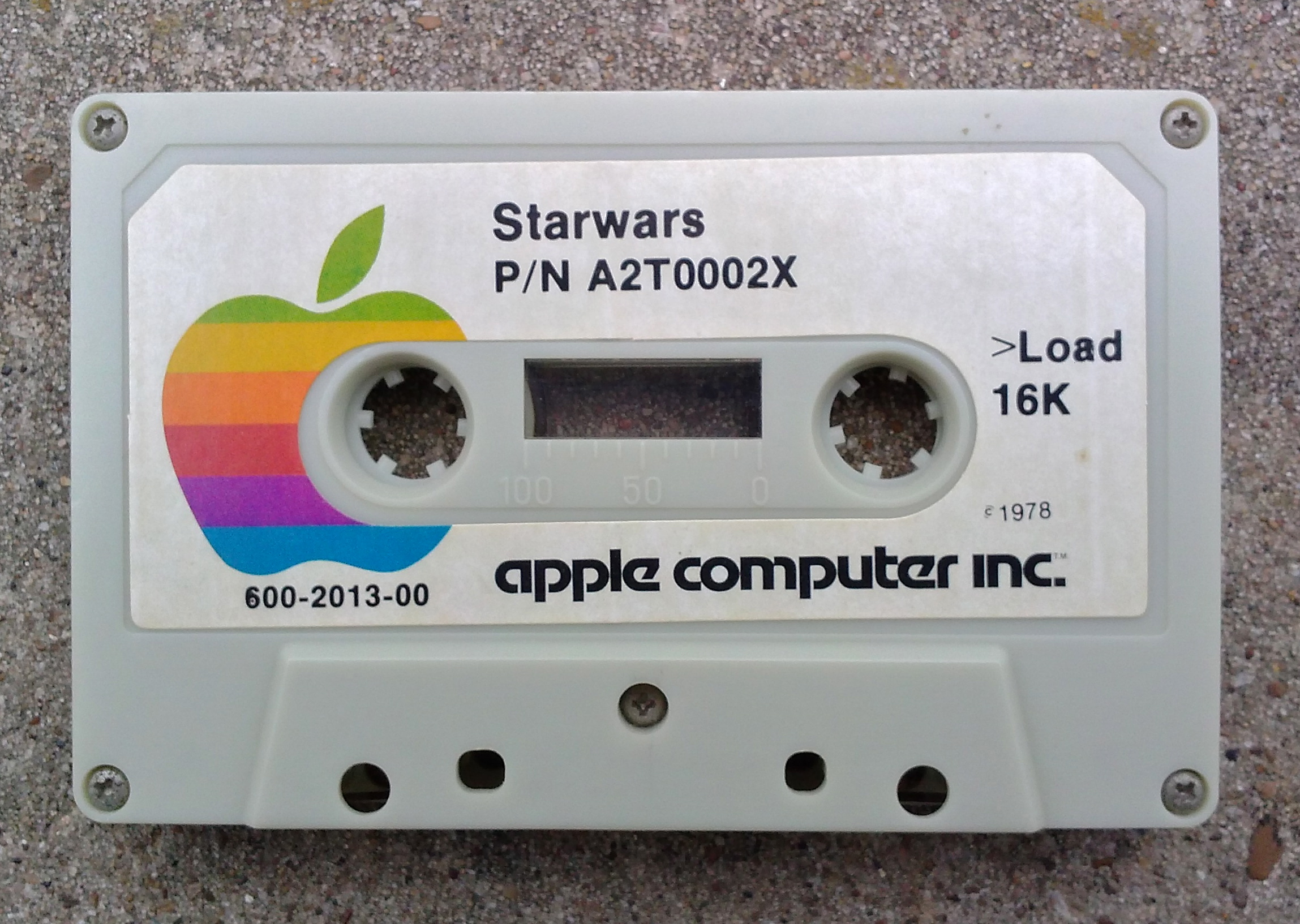
A compact cassette with a game for the Apple II

Early Apple II computers used compact cassette tapes to store programs and data. Apple did not produce a dedicated cassette recorder, instead recommending the commercially available Panasonic RQ309 in some early documentation. Although cassette storage helped keep the cost of an Apple II system low, it was relatively slow and unreliable.

The Apple II's cassette tape interface was also used for audio input and output. Applications included receiving slow-scan television images and experimental audio programs, such as Bob Bishop's Music Kaleidoscope, which generated colored screen patterns from audio signals.

=== 5 1/4-inch floppy disk ===
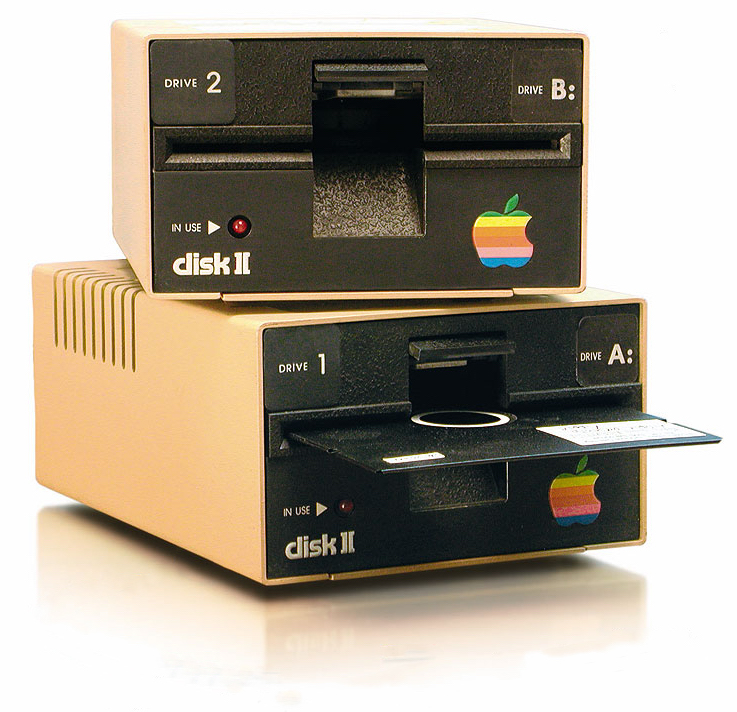
Disk II drives

Introduced in June 1978, the Disk II was a 5 1/4-inch floppy disk drive designed by Steve Wozniak for the Apple II. It offered faster and more reliable storage than cassette tapes. Wozniak also designed its controller card using substantially fewer chips than existing designs.

To develop the accompanying disk operating system, Apple contracted Shepardson Microsystems on April 10, 1978, for US$13,000 (equivalent to $64,171 in 2025) to create Apple DOS.

Apple later introduced other 5 1/4-inch drives for the Apple II family, including the Disk III, DuoDisk, Disk IIc, UniDisk 5.25, and Apple 5.25 Drive. These models differed in their designs and connections, and compatibility varied by computer and interface.

=== 3 1/2-inch floppy disk ===
In 1984, Apple introduced 3 1/2-inch floppy disks with the Macintosh and later adopted the format for some Apple II models. Support was limited by hardware requirements and the continued availability of software on 5.25-inch disks. The IIGS and IIc Plus supported the UniDisk 3.5 drive without additional upgrades, although only the IIc Plus had a built-in 3 1/2-inch drive. The format became standard on the IIGS. The UniDisk 3.5 could be with the IIc with a ROM update and with the IIe with a new controller card. Apple later introduced the 1.44-megabyte SuperDrive for the Apple II.

== Legacy ==
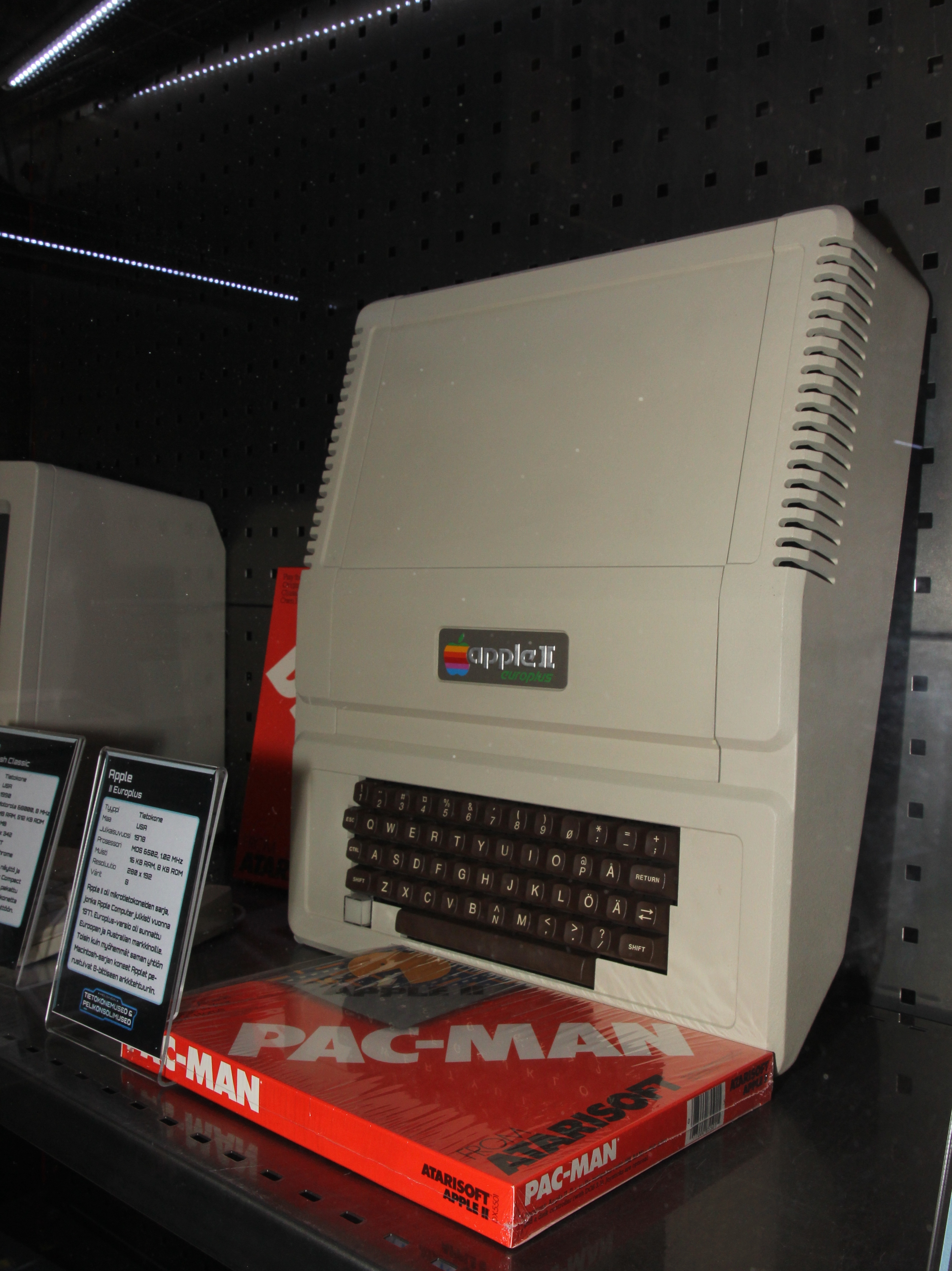
Apple II Europlus computer with Scandinavian keyboard layout in Helsinki's computer and game console museum

The Apple II series of computers had an enormous impact on the technology industry and expanded the role of microcomputers in society. Its price was within the reach of many middle-class families, and a partnership with MECC helped make the Apple II popular in schools. By the end of 1980 Apple had already sold over 100,000 Apple IIs, and at the introduction of the IIGS, 3 million models in the range had been sold. However, in other markets, the range saw rather more limited adoption, with only 120,000 units selling in the UK over this nine-year period.

The Apple II's popularity bootstrapped the computer game and educational software markets and began the boom in the word processor and computer printer markets. In 1978, 9 Apple II computers were used for the hit TV game show Tic Tac Dough’s game board. The 9 Apple II’s were programmed and linked to a master Altair 8800 computer that controlled display and movement of X’s, O’s, categories, bonus game numbers and amounts, TIC, TAC, and the Dragon during main and bonus game play, as well as displaying custom messages and an active screen saver. It was the first game show to use a fully computerized game board. The first spreadsheet application, VisiCalc, was initially released for the Apple II, and many businesses bought them just to run VisiCalc. Its success drove IBM in part to create the IBM PC, which many businesses purchased to run spreadsheet and word processing software, at first ported from Apple II versions.

The Apple II's slots allowed any peripheral card to take control of the bus and directly access memory; this enabled independent card manufacturers to create a wide range of hardware products, allowing users to build powerful low cost systems. Generally competing systems were not as expandable and typically had more restricted and proprietary interfaces. The first Apple II peripheral card was a blank prototyping card intended for electronics enthusiasts to design their own peripherals.

Specialty peripherals kept the Apple II in use in industry and education environments for many years after Apple Computer stopped supporting the Apple II. Well into the 1990s every clean-room (the super-clean facility where spacecraft are prepared for flight) at the Kennedy Space Center used an Apple II to monitor the environment and air quality. Many planetariums of the time used Apple IIs to control their projectors and other equipment.

The game port was unusually powerful and could be used for digital and analog input and output. The early manuals included instructions for how to build a circuit with only four commonly available components (one transistor and three resistors) and a software routine to drive a common Teletype Model 33 machine. Don Lancaster used the game port I/O to drive a LaserWriter printer.

=== Modern use ===
Emulators for various Apple II models are available to run Apple II software on macOS, Linux, Windows, homebrew-enabled Nintendo DS and other operating systems. Numerous disk images of Apple II software are available free over the Internet for use with these emulators. AppleWin and MESS are examples of emulators compatible with most Apple II images. The MESS emulator supports recording and playing back of Apple II emulation sessions, as does Home Action Replay Page (a.k.a. HARP).

There is still a small annual convention, KansasFest, dedicated to the platform.

In 2017, the band 8 Bit Weapon released the world's first 100% Apple II-based music album entitled, "Class Apples". The album featured dance-oriented cover versions of classical music by Bach, Beethoven, and Mozart recorded directly off the Apple II motherboard.

Timeline of Apple II family
See also: Timeline of the Apple II series, Timeline of Macintosh models, and Timeline of Apple Inc. products

== See also ==
- Apple Industrial Design Group – Industrial design arm of Apple Inc.
- List of Apple II application software
- List of Apple II games
- List of Apple IIGS games
- List of publications and periodicals devoted to the Apple II
