= Apple IIe Card =

Compatibility card

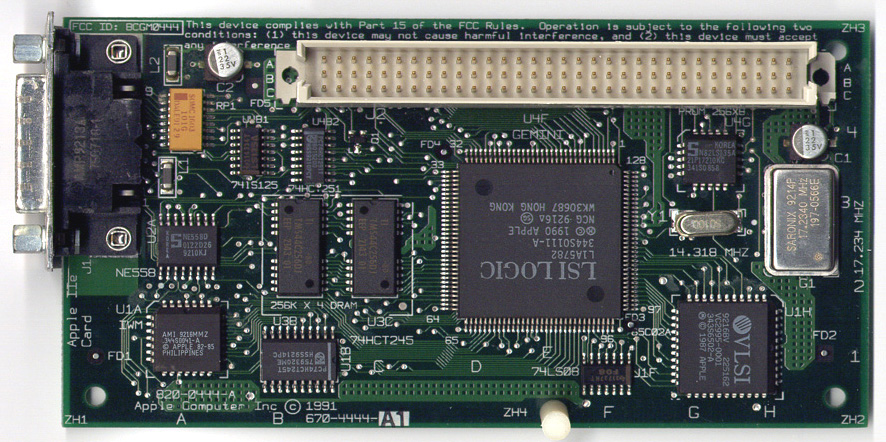
- Apple IIe Card (annotated version)
- Developer: Apple Computer
- Type: Compatibility card
- Released: March 1991; 35 years ago
- Introductory price: US$250 (equivalent to $590 in 2025)
- Discontinued: May 1995

The Apple IIe Card is a compatibility card, which through hardware and software emulation, allows certain Macintosh computers to run software designed for the Apple II (excluding the 16-bit IIGS). Released in March 1991 for use with the Macintosh LC family of computers, Apple targeted the card at the educational market to ease the transition from Apple II-based schools, with large catalogs of educational software titles, to Macintosh-based schools.

== Overview ==
During the 1980s, Apple established a strong presence in the United States education market with the Apple II family of computers. Schools had accumulated extensive libraries of Apple II software. Their investment in this software had kept many from switching to competing platforms, but it also kept them from buying the Macintosh.

In March 1991, Apple introduced the Apple IIe Card to help schools transition from Apple II computers to Macintosh systems, particularly the Macintosh LC line, which had debuted in October 1990 as a lower-cost option with color graphics. The card enabled compatible Macintosh computers to run Apple II software, allowing schools to continue using existing applications while adopting Macintosh hardware. With an external Apple 5.25 Drive connected, software could be run directly from Apple II floppy disks.

A similar "Apple IIGS Card" was planned for running 16-bit Apple IIGS software, but was canceled after being deemed too costly, therefore leaving no migration path for that segment of the Apple II line.

Apple asked the media to refer to the peripheral as an "option board", as earlier third-party Apple II "emulators" did not work well.

In Apple IIe mode, the card uses the host Macintosh's peripherals as Apple II devices, including its keyboard, mouse, internal speaker, serial ports, additional memory (up to 1 MB), internal 3.5-inch floppy disk drive, and hard disk. The included Y-cable allows for the simultaneous connection of up to two Apple 5.25 Drive floppy disk drives, an Apple UniDisk 3.5 floppy disk drive, and an Apple II game controller.

Apple IIe mode runs full-screen; windowed operation is not supported. Macintosh operations are suspended while the card is active.

== Technical aspects ==
Like the Apple IIe itself, the Apple IIe Card uses an onboard WDC 65C02 processor, which can be configured in software to run at either the Apple IIe's native speed of 1.023 MHz or an accelerated 2.046 MHz. Video emulation, including text and graphics, is handled in software using the Macintosh's native QuickDraw routines. This can make some operations slower than on a physical Apple IIe, although performance varies by host Macintosh model.

Compatible Macintosh computers can be switched to a 560 × 384 display resolution to accommodate Apple IIe graphics modes. This doubles the Apple IIe's 280 × 192 high-resolution color graphics mode in both dimensions and doubles the vertical resolution of the 560 × 192 double-high-resolution monochrome graphics mode. The card uses its onboard 17.2349 MHz oscillator in place of the Macintosh's usual video clock, a capability enabled by the local bus architecture of the processor direct slot (PDS). This mode is particularly useful on the Macintosh Color Classic, whose standard display resolution is 512 × 384 pixels. The monitor's scan rate remains unchanged, while the horizontal pixel density increases by 10% to fit the additional pixels across the same screen width.

The Apple IIe Card has 256 KB of RAM, half of which is used to emulate the Apple IIe's standard 128 KB of memory: 64 KB of main memory and 64 KB provided by the bank-switched Extended 80-Column Text Card. A small portion of the remaining memory stores the Apple IIe's 16 KB ROM.

According to Macworld, assistance from Apple IIGS engineers in designing the card helped ensure compatibility with copy-protected software and other Apple IIe programs, with the exception of "a few very esoteric games".

The host Macintosh emulates or provides access to many expansion cards and peripherals used by a standalone Apple IIe. These include the internal 3.5-inch 1.44 MB SuperDrive, mouse, up to 1 MB of Macintosh memory, 80-column text and monochrome or color graphics, a clock, numeric keypad, two hardware serial ports, a SCSI hard disk, and an AppleShare file server. The card also emulates a serial port used by the Apple IIe mouse.

An included Y-cable allows the connection of up to two external 140 KB Apple 5.25 Drive floppy disk drives, an 800 KB Apple UniDisk 3.5 floppy disk drive, and an Apple II joystick or paddles. Other floppy drives for the Apple II are not supported, because the card's Integrated Woz Machine floppy-disk controller is incompatible with those drives.

The product included the PDS card, Y-cable, owner's manual and two 3.5" floppy disks: the 'Apple IIe installer disk' and the 'Apple IIe card startup disk'. Version 2.2.2d1 is the final revision of the startup disk.

Macintosh computers could not normally read Apple IIe disks. To recognize ProDOS disks, the ProDOS File System extension was installed in the System Folder. After the Apple IIe Card software was installed, the Macintosh could recognize files stored in the ProDOS file system. Double-clicking an Apple IIe application or file icon launched the Apple IIe environment. Users could partition a hard disk to store both Macintosh and ProDOS applications or files, which made them easier to access than when kept on floppy disks.

For users who did not have a hard drive, or did not wish to partition their hard drive, could boot their Macintosh from the included IIe Startup Disk, which contained the Apple IIe Card software and a bootable copy of the Macintosh operating system.

== Reception ==
Apple stated that the LC helped the company regain educational market share lost to inexpensive PC clones. As of May 1992, about half of the LCs sold to schools used the IIe Card.

Some educators and users were critical of the card's limitations and shortcomings. Macintosh LC and LC II are not fast enough to fully handle video emulation, resulting in slow scrolling of text-based software, or sluggish and or jittery screen redraws for graphical applications and animations. While workable, not until faster computers did this issue became less apparent. Additionally, every time users wish to run Apple II software, they have to wait for the Macintosh operating system to boot up before launching the specialized software. If an incompatibility or emulation bug causes a crash, the entire process has to be repeated, requiring a wait of several minutes, as opposed to simply power cycling a real Apple IIe.

Special needs software is incompatible due to limitations. For the visually impaired that require a speech synthesis card or the physically disabled that require hardware add-ons like adaptive input devices, the Apple IIe Card does not emulate or support these peripherals.

== Technical specifications ==
The Apple IIe Card included:

- The "Gemini" chip, manufactured by LSI Logic and based largely on the Mega II chip developed for the Apple IIGS, which integrated most functions of an Apple IIe system onto a single chip, excluding the processor, RAM, and video generation.
- An Integrated Woz Machine (IWM) chip for floppy disk control.
- 256 KB of onboard RAM.
- A 65C02 processor running at either 1.023 MHz or 2.046 MHz.
- A 26-pin port to attach a Y-cable for connecting floppy drives and a game controller.
- Support for accessing up to 1 MB of Macintosh RAM.
- Support for all Apple IIe text and video modes through software emulation using QuickDraw.

When emulating the Apple IIe, the card operated in full-screen mode, making Macintosh functions unavailable until the user exited emulation. A control panel allowed users to configure virtual Apple II slots and peripherals. Both Macintosh and Apple II functions were paused while the control panel was open.

== Host system compatibility ==
The Apple IIe Card plugs into the processor direct slot (PDS) in compatible Macintosh LC-series computers, although compatibility depends on the model and system software.

Apple officially lists the following compatible models: Color Classic, Color Classic II, LC, LC II (also sold as the Performa 400, 405, 410, and 430), LC III and III+ (also sold as the Performa 450, 460, 466, and 467), LC 475 (also sold as the Quadra 605, and Performa 475 and 476), and the LC 520, 550, and 575 (also sold as the Performa 520, 550, 560, 575, 577, and 578).

Other 68K Macintosh models with an LC-compatible PDS and support for 24-bit memory addressing may also work, although not officially supported.

To use the card, the host Macintosh must run System 6.0.8 through System 7.5.5. Users running System 7 on models that support both 32-bit and 24-bit addressing modes must enable 24-bit addressing in the Memory control panel. System 7.6 and later do not support 24-bit addressing.

== Timelines ==
Timeline of Apple II family
See also: Timeline of the Apple II series, Timeline of Macintosh models, and Timeline of Apple Inc. products

Timeline of Macintosh Centris, LC, Performa, and Quadra models, colored by CPU type

See also: List of Mac models

== See also ==
- Apple II peripheral cards
