= AppleWin =

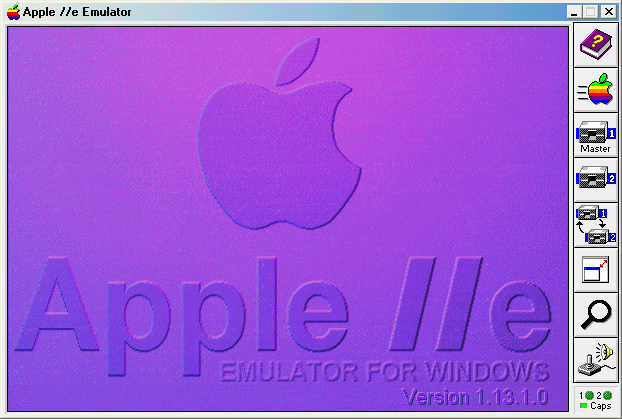
- The AppleWin program and its startup splash screen.
- Original author: Mike O'Brien
- Developers: Tom Charlesworth, Michael Pohoreski, Nick Westgate, Linards Ticmanis, Glenn Jones, Stannev
- Initial release: 1994
- Stable release: 1.31.0.0 / September 28, 2025; 4 months ago
- Repository: github.com/applewin/applewin
- Written in: C, C++
- Operating system: Windows
- Size: 1,620 KB
- Available in: English
- Type: Hardware virtualization
- License: GNU GPL
- Website: github.com/AppleWin/AppleWin

AppleWin (also known as Apple //e Emulator for Windows) is an open source software emulator for running Apple II programs in Microsoft Windows. AppleWin was originally written by Mike O'Brien in 1994; O'Brien himself announced an early version of the emulator in April 1995 just before the release of Windows 95. Development of AppleWin passed to Oliver Schmidt and is now maintained by Tom Charlesworth. AppleWin originally required a minimum Intel 486 CPU and is written in C++.

AppleWin has support for most programs that could run either on the Apple II+ or the Apple IIe. By default, AppleWin emulates the Extended Keyboard IIe (better known as the Platinum IIe) with built-in 80-column text support, 128 kilobytes of RAM, two 5¼-inch floppy disk drives, a joystick, a serial card and 65C02 CPU. AppleWin supports lo-res, hi-res, and double hi-res graphics modes and can emulate both color and monochrome Apple II monitors; later versions of AppleWin also can emulate a television set used as a monitor. Both 40-column and 80-column text is supported.

AppleWin can emulate the Apple II joystick (using the PC's default controller), paddle controllers (using the computer mouse), and can also emulate the Apple II joystick using the PC keyboard. AppleWin can also use the PC speaker to emulate the Apple II's sound if no sound card is available (does not work under NT-based Windows versions). Full screen mode is available through the use of DirectX. Features added to the latest versions of AppleWin include Ethernet support using Uthernet, Mockingboard and Phasor sound card support, SSI263 speech synthesis, hard drive disk images, save states, and taking screenshots.

== Supported disk images ==
AppleWin supports ProDOS and DOS 3.3 disk image formats as well as copy-protected programs copied with "nibble copiers" to a disk image.

Specifically, AppleWin recognizes .BIN, .DO, .DSK, .NIB, .PO and .WOZ filename extensions as Apple II disk image files along with reading disk images from compressed (.zip / .gzip) files. Disk images may also be optionally "write protected" if they are mounted as "Read Only."
