= Apple IIGS =

1986 personal computer

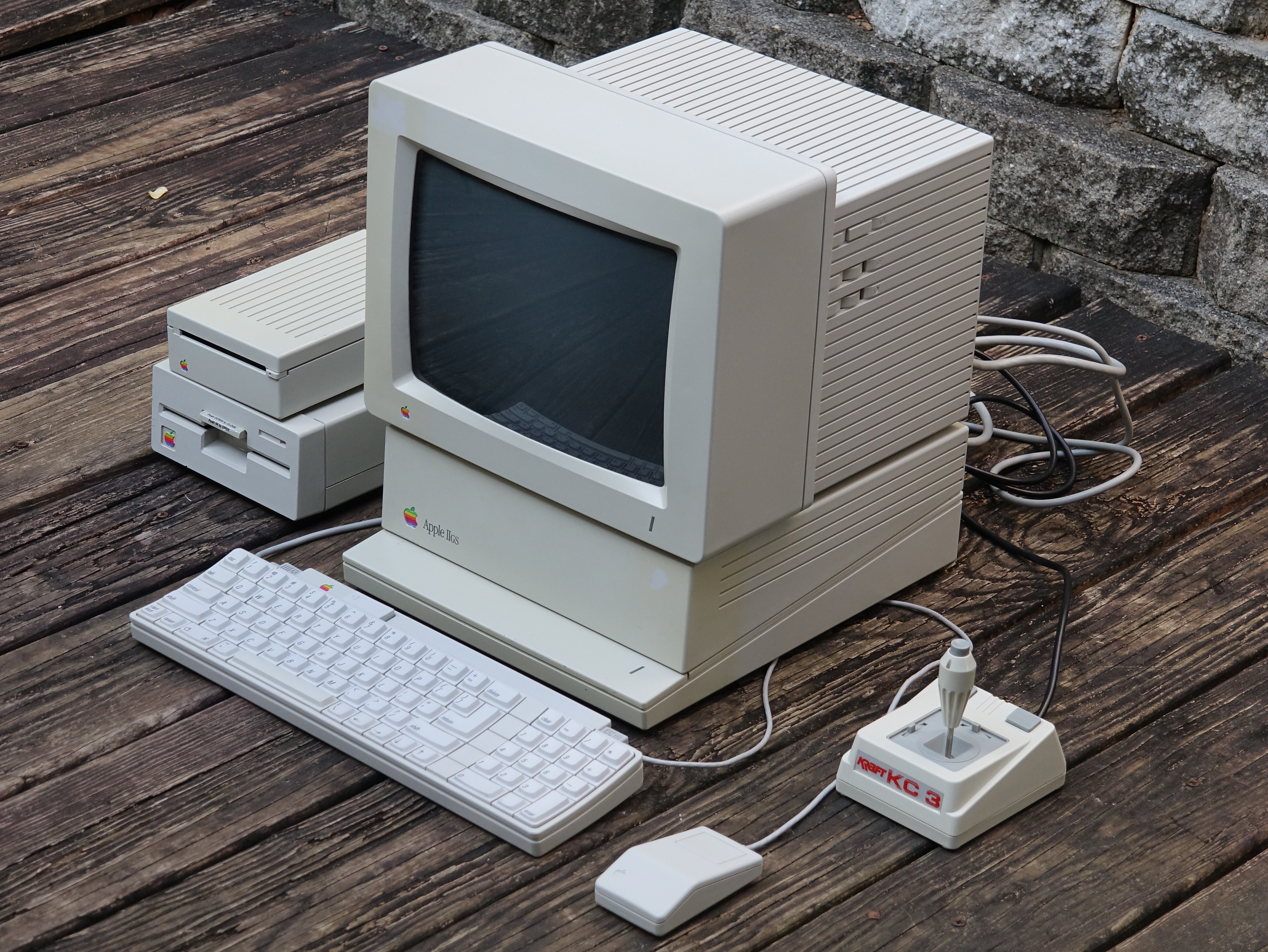
- Manufacturer: Apple Computer
- Released: September 15, 1986; 40 years ago
- Introductory price: US$999 (equivalent to $2,930 in 2025) without monitor
- Discontinued: December 4, 1992; 33 years ago
- Operating system: ProDOS 16; GS/OS
- CPU: WDC 65C816 @ 2.8 MHz
- Memory: 256 KB, 512 KB or 1 MB, expandable to 8 MB
- Graphics: 320×200 (4 bit); 640×200 (2 bpp); Palette of 12 bits per color
- Sound: Ensoniq ES5503 8-bit wavetable synthesis chip, 32 channels

The Apple IIGS (styled as IIGS) is a 16-bit personal computer produced by Apple Computer beginning in September 1986. It is the fifth and most powerful model of the Apple II family. The "GS" in the name stands for "Graphics and Sound", referring to its enhanced multimedia hardware, especially the "state-of-the-art" audio. It is compatible with earlier Apple II models, and Apple initially sold a kit for converting an Apple IIe into a IIGS. 8-bit Apple II software runs nearly three times as fast on the IIGS by default.

The system is a radical departure otherwise, with a WDC 65C816 microprocessor, 256 KB—1 MB of random-access memory expandable to 8 MB, resolution and color similar to the Amiga and Atari ST, and a 32 channel Ensoniq wavetable synthesis chip. Bundled with a mouse, it is the first computer from Apple with a color graphical user interface (color was introduced on the Macintosh II six months later) and the Apple Desktop Bus interface for keyboards, mice, and other input devices.

The IIGS blurred the lines between the Apple II and Macintosh. After releasing the IIGS, Apple chose to focus on the Mac and no new Apple IIGS models were released. The standard RAM was doubled to 512 KB in 1988, then to 1 MB in 1989, and there were two firmware updates. Apple ceased IIGS production on December 4, 1992.

== Hardware ==
The Apple IIGS made significant improvements over the Apple IIe and Apple IIc. It emulates its predecessors via a custom chip called the Mega II and includes the then-new WDC 65C816 16-bit microprocessor. The processor runs at 2.8 MHz, which is faster than the 8-bit processors used in the earlier Apple II models. The 24-bit memory addressing of the 65C816 allows the IIGS to use considerably more RAM. The original 65C816 processor in the IIGS was certified to run at up to 4 MHz. Faster versions of the 65C816 processor were readily available, with speeds of between 5 and 14 MHz, but Apple kept the machine at 2.8 MHz throughout its production run.

Its graphical capabilities have higher resolution video modes and more color than 8-bit Apple II models. These include a 640×200-pixel mode with 2-bit color depth and a 320×200 mode with 4-bit color, both of which can select 4 or 16 colors (respectively) at a time from a palette of 4,096 colors. By changing the palette per scan line, it is possible to display 3,200 colors at once.

The audio is generated by a Ensoniq 5503 digital synthesizer chip with 32 channels of sound. These channels can be paired to produce 15 voices in stereo. There is 64 KB of dedicated RAM for use by the 5503.

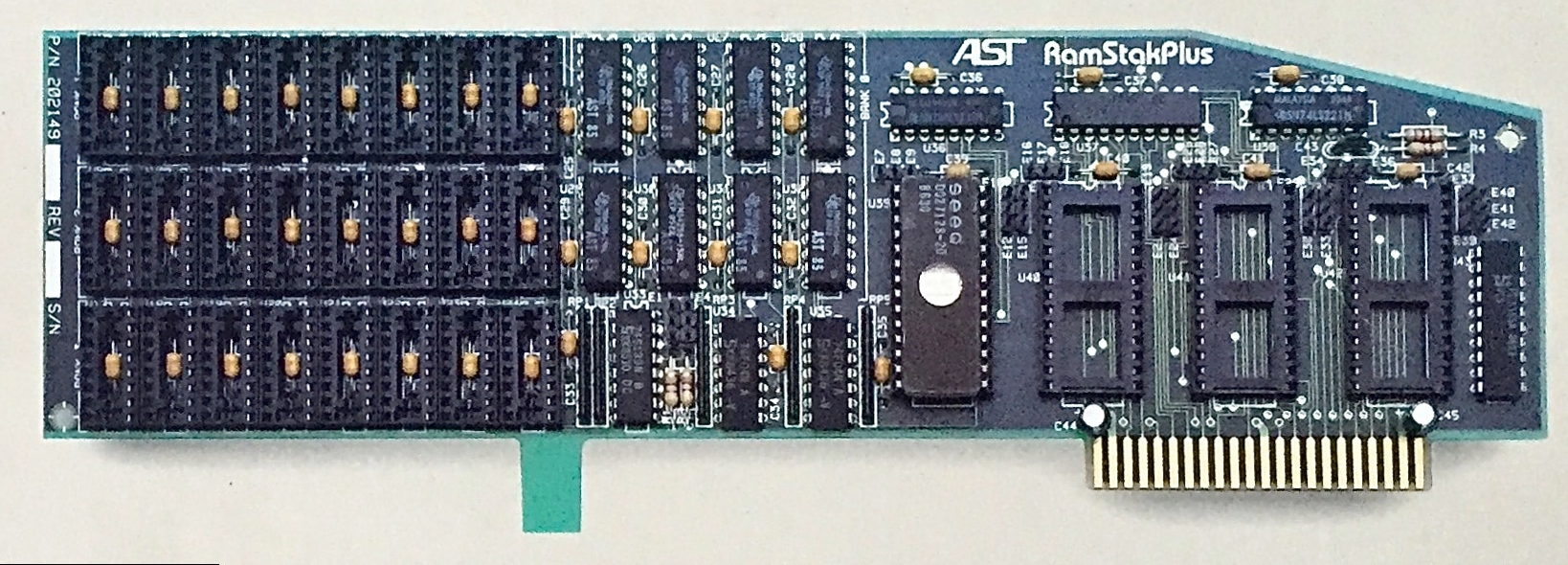
AST RamStakPlus memory board for Apple IIGS

The IIGS supports both 5.25-inch and 3.5-inch floppy disks and has seven general-purpose expansion slots compatible with those on the Apple II, II+, and IIe. It also has a memory expansion slot for up to 8 MB of RAM. The IIGS has ports for external floppy disk drives, two serial ports for devices such as printers and modems (which can also be used to connect to a LocalTalk network), an Apple Desktop Bus port to connect the keyboard and mouse, and composite and RGB video ports.

A real-time clock is maintained by a built-in battery (initially a non-replaceable 3.6-volt lithium battery; removable in a later-revision motherboard).

The IIGS also supports booting from an AppleShare server, via the AppleTalk protocol, over LocalTalk cabling. This was over a decade before NetBoot offered the same capability to computers running Mac OS 8.

=== Graphics ===
In addition to supporting all the text and bitmapped Apple II graphics modes of earlier models, the Apple IIGS's Video Graphics Chip (VGC) introduced a new "Super-High Resolution" mode with a vastly wider color palette and no color bleeding and fringing. Super-High-Resolution supports 200 lines, in either 320 or 640 pixels horizontally. Both modes use a 12-bit palette for a total of 4,096 possible colors. There can be between 4 and 3,200 colors onscreen at once, with no more than 16 per line. A fill mode setting allows fast solid-fill graphics by automatically repeating a pixel's color to the right along the same scan line—until a different color pixel is reached.

Each row of the display can independently select either 320 or 640 pixels, fill mode (320 pixels only), and any of the 16 palettes. These settings provide many possibilities:

- 320×200 pixels with a single palette of 16 colors.
- 320×200 pixels with up to 16 palettes of 16 colors. The VGC holds 16 separate palettes of 16 colors in its own memory. Each of the 200 scan lines can be assigned any one of these palettes, allowing for up to 256 colors on the screen at once.
- 320×200 pixels with up to 200 palettes of 16 colors. The CPU assists the VGC in swapping palettes into and out of the video memory so that each scan line can have its own palette of 16 colors, allowing for up to 3,200 colors on the screen at once.
- 320×200 pixels with 15 colors per palette, plus a fill-mode color. Color 0 in the palette is replaced by the last non-zero color pixel displayed on the scan line (to the left).
- 640×200 pixels with 4 pure colors.
- 640×200 pixels with up to 16 palettes of 4 pure colors. The VGC holds 16 separate palettes of 4 pure colors in its own memory. Each of the 200 scan lines can be assigned any one of these palettes, allowing for up to 64 colors on the screen at once.
- 640x200 pixels with up to 200 palettes of 4 pure colors. The CPU assists the VGC in swapping palettes into and out of the video memory so that each scan line can have its own palette of 4 colors, allowing for up to 800 colors on the screen at once.
- 640×200 pixels with 16 dithered colors. Two palettes of four pure colors each are used in alternating columns. The hardware then dithers the colors of adjacent pixels to create 16 total colors on the screen.

=== Audio ===
The Apple IIGS's sound is provided by an Ensoniq 5503 DOC (Digital Oscillator Chip) wavetable synthesis chip designed by Bob Yannes, creator of the SID synthesizer chip used in the Commodore 64. The ES5503 DOC is the same chip used in Ensoniq Mirage and Ensoniq ESQ-1 professional-grade synthesizers. The chip has 32 oscillators, which allows for a maximum of 32 voices (with limited capabilities when all used independently), though Apple's firmware pairs them for 16 voices, to produce fuller and more flexible sound, as do most of the standard tools of the operating system (the Apple MIDISynth toolset goes even a step further for richer sound, grouping four oscillators per voice, for a limit of seven-voice audio). The IIGS is often referred to as a 15-voice system, because one voice, or "sound generator" consisting of two oscillators, is always reserved as a dedicated clock for the sound chip's timing interrupt generator. Software that does not use the system firmware, or uses custom-programmed tools (certain games, demos, and music software), can access the chip directly and take advantage of all 32 voices.

A standard 1/8-inch headphone jack is on the back of the case, and standard stereo computer speakers can be attached there. This jack provides only monaural sound and a third-party adapter card is required for stereo; despite that, the Ensoniq and virtually all native software produces stereo audio. The Ensoniq can drive 16 speaker output channels, but the Molex expansion connector Apple provided only allows 8. There is 64 KB of dedicated memory (DOC-RAM) on the IIGS motherboard, separate from system memory, for the Ensoniq chip to store its sampled wavetable instruments.

To exploit the IIGS's audio capabilities, during its introduction, Apple sold Bose Roommate amplified speakers for the computer (matching its platinum color and with custom Bose/Apple logo grille covers).

=== Expansion ===
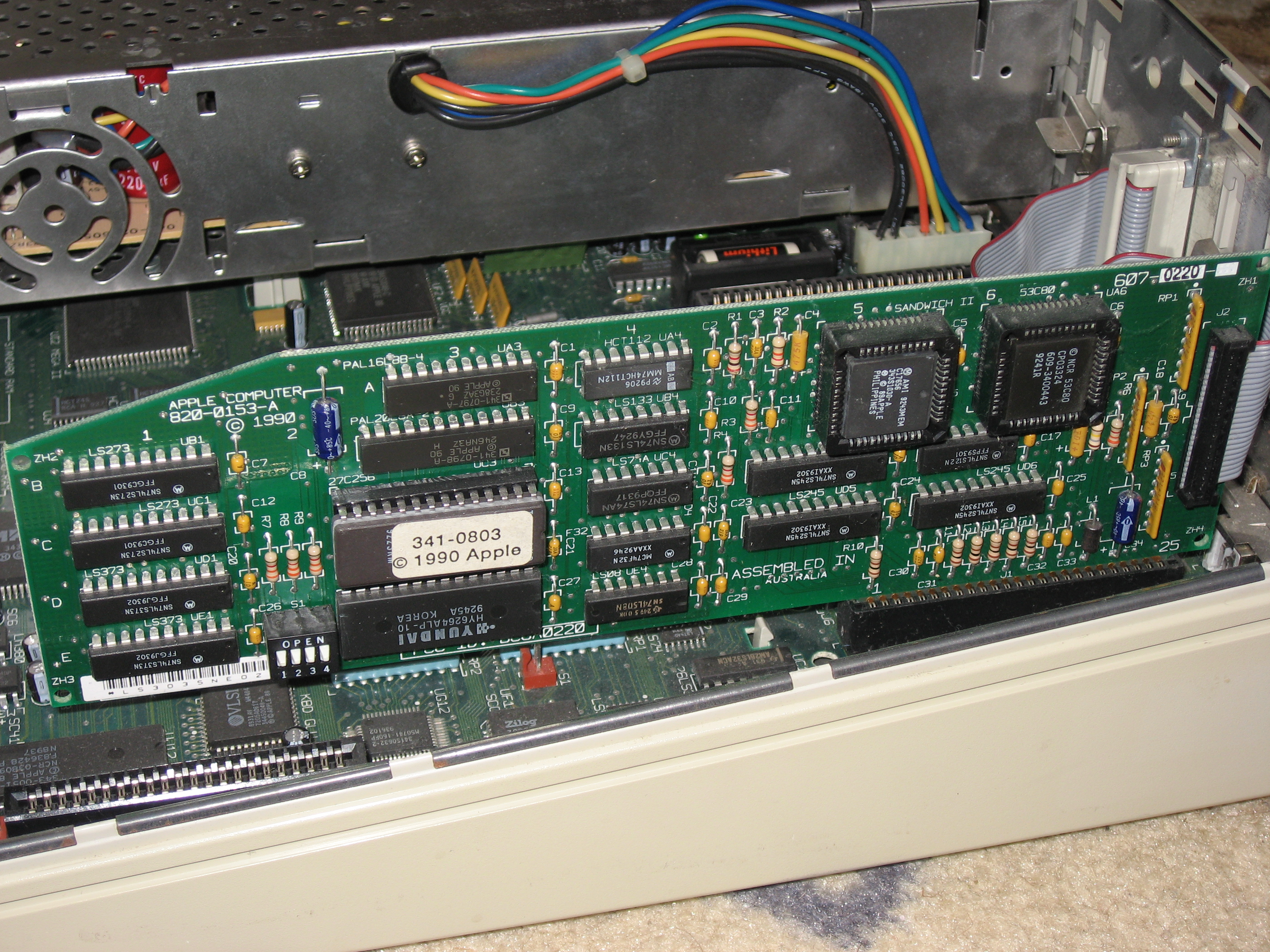
An Apple SCSI expansion card installed in an Apple IIGS

The expansion slots on the IIGS can be used to increase the computer's capabilities with contemporary and modern hardware, such as SCSI host adapters for external SCSI devices like hard drives and CD-ROM drives, or adapters for more recent internal 2.5-inch IDE hard drives. Available Apple II peripheral cards include accelerator cards, which replace the computer's original processor with a faster one.

== Development ==
Steve Wozniak said in January 1985 that Apple was investigating the 65816, and that an 8 MHz version would "beat the pants off a 68000 in most applications", but any product using it would have to be compatible with the Apple II. Rumors spread about his work on an "Apple IIx". The IIx was said to have a 16-bit CPU, one megabyte of RAM, and better graphics and sound. "IIx" was the code name for Apple's first internal project to develop a next-generation Apple II based on the 65816. The IIx project became bogged down when it attempted to include various coprocessors allowing it to emulate other computer systems. Early samples of the 65816 were also problematic. These problems led to the cancellation of the IIx project.

A new project was later formed which led to the IIGS. It was known by various codenames during development: "Phoenix", "Rambo", "Gumby", and "Cortland".

Some design features from the unsuccessful Apple III lived on in the Apple IIGS, such as GS/OS borrowing elements from SOS (including, by way of ProDOS, the SOS file system), a unique keyboard feature for dual-speed arrow keys, and colorized ASCII text.

== Release ==
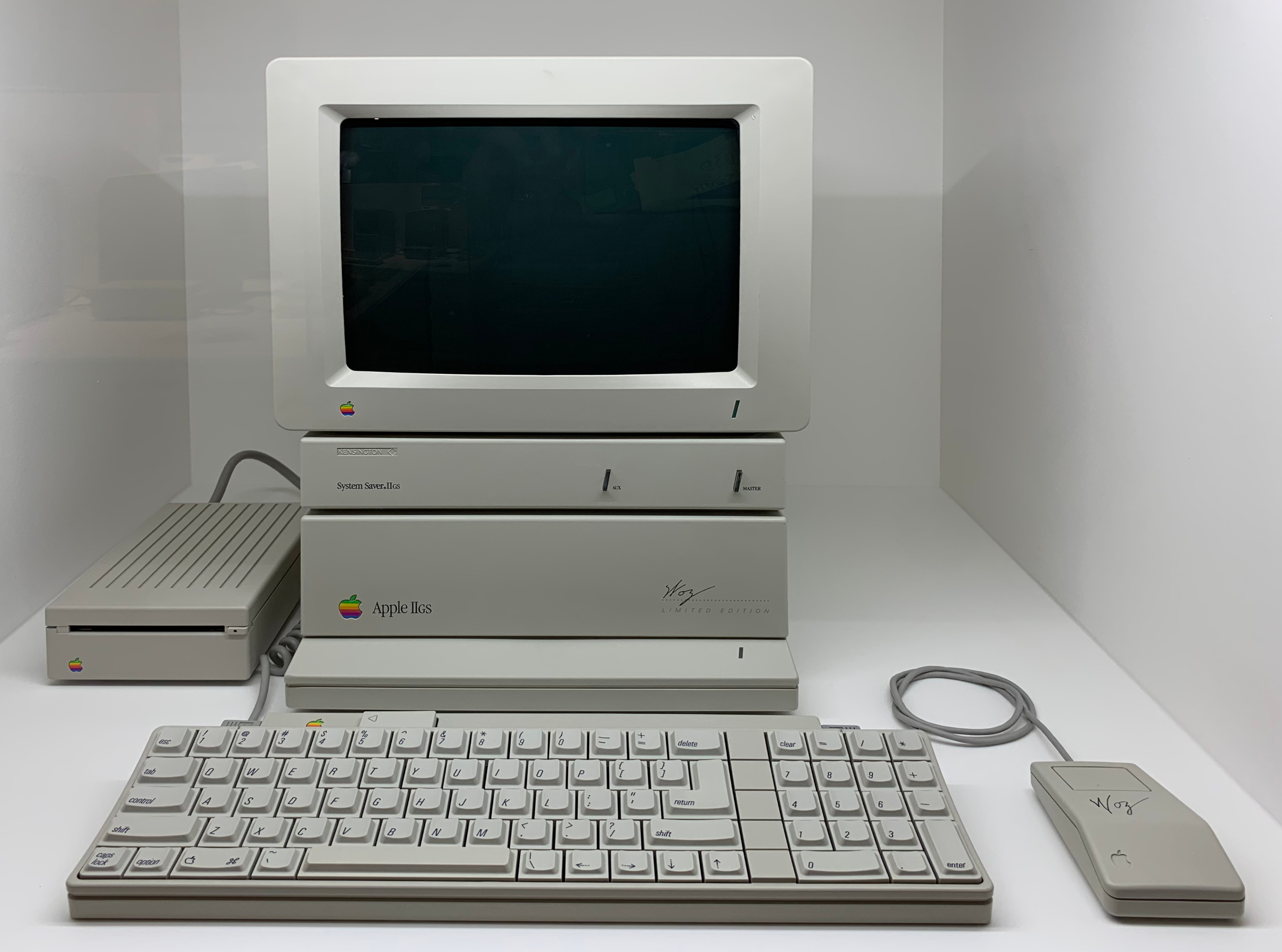
An original Apple IIGS "Woz Edition", with signature on the front

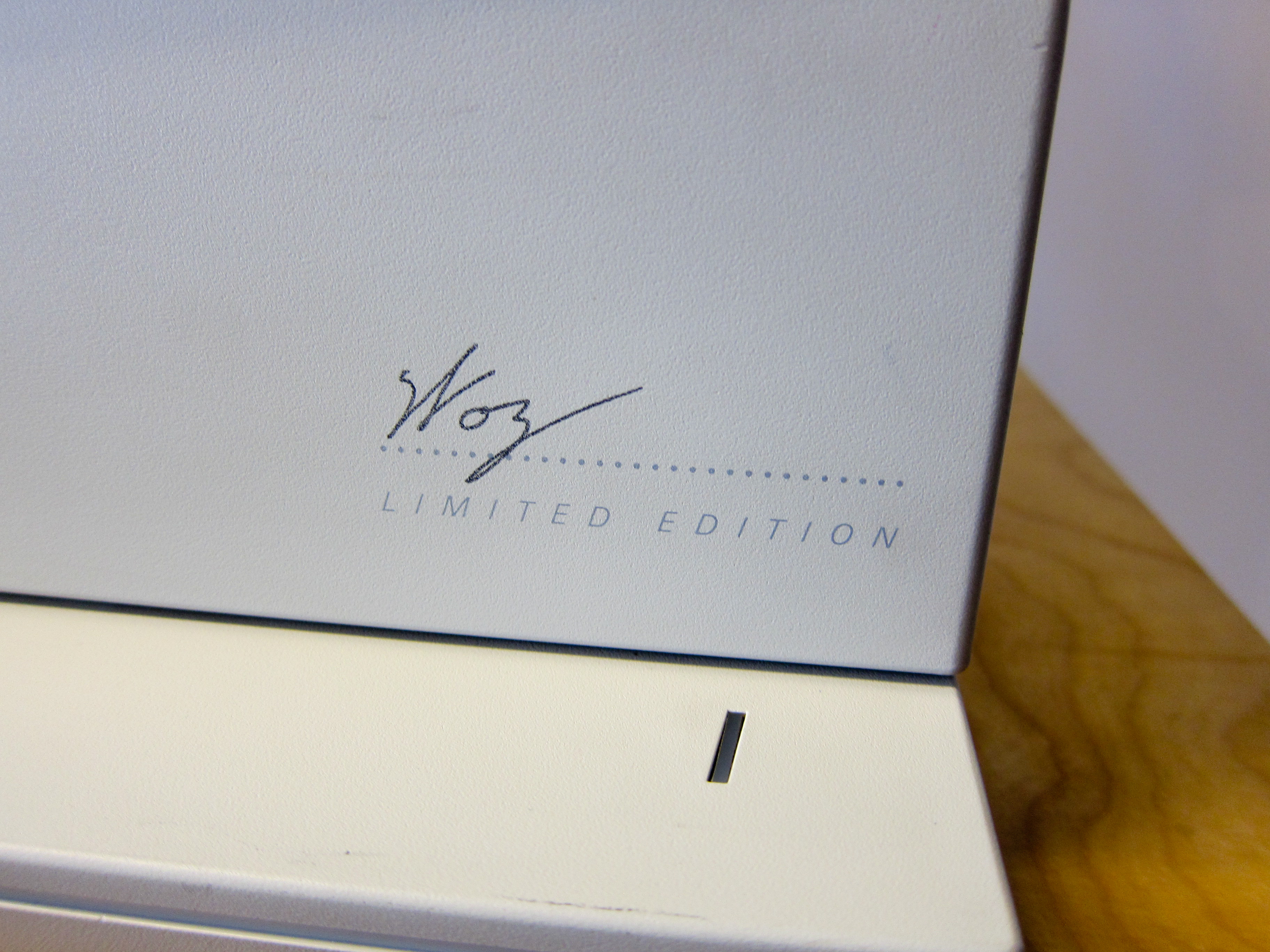
A close-up view of the "Woz" signature printed on the Limited Edition Apple IIGS

=== Limited Edition ("Woz"-signed case) ===
As part of a commemorative celebration marking the 10th anniversary of the Apple II series' development, as well as Apple Computer itself celebrating the same anniversary, a special limited edition was introduced at product launch. The first 50,000 Apple IIGSs manufactured had a reproduced copy of Wozniak's signature ("Woz") at the front right corner of the case, with a dotted line and the phrase "Limited Edition" printed just below it. Owners of the Limited Edition, after mailing in their Apple registration card, were mailed back a certificate of authenticity signed by Wozniak and 12 key Apple engineers, as well as a personal letter from Wozniak himself (both machine-reproduced). Because the difference between standard and Limited Edition machines was purely cosmetic, many owners of new were able to "convert" to the Limited Edition by merely swapping the case lid from an older (and likely nonfunctional) machine.

=== Upgrading an Apple IIe ===
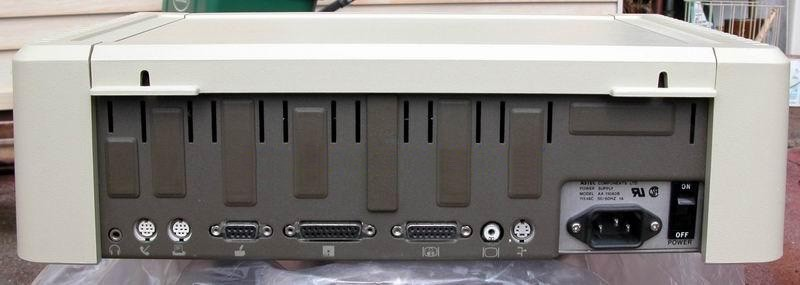
Back view of IIGS upgrade, with the new port openings and connectors

Upon its release in September 1986, Apple announced it would be making a kit that would upgrade an Apple IIe to a IIGS available for purchase. This followed an Apple practice of making logic board upgrades available that dated from the earliest days of the Apple II until Steve Jobs' return to Apple in 1997. The IIe-to-IIGS upgrade replaced the IIe motherboard with a 16-bit IIGS motherboard. Users would take their Apple IIe machines into an authorized Apple dealership, where the IIe motherboard and lower baseboard of the case were swapped for an Apple IIGS motherboard with a new baseboard (with matching cut-outs for the new built-in ports). New metal sticker ID badges replaced those on the front of the IIe, rebranding the machine. Retained were the upper half of the IIe case, the keyboard, speaker, and power supply. Original IIGS motherboards (those produced between 1986 and mid-1989) have electrical connections for the IIe power supply and keyboard present, although only about half of those produced have the physical plug connectors factory-presoldered in, which were mostly reserved for the upgrade kits.

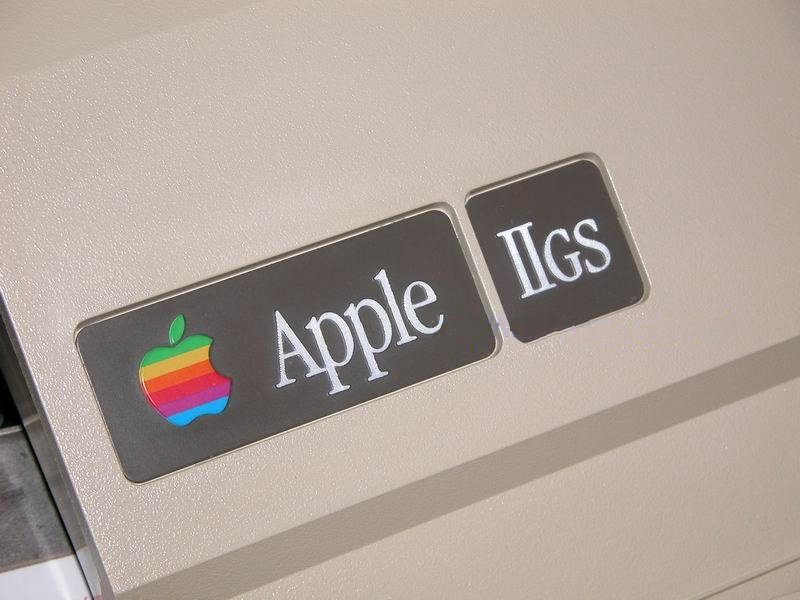
The replacement nameplates for the front lid, used in the Apple IIe-to-IIGS upgrade

The upgrade cost US$500, plus the trade-in of the user's existing Apple IIe motherboard. It did not include a mouse, and the keyboard, although functional, lacked a numeric keypad and did not mimic all the features and functions of the Apple Desktop Bus keyboard. Some cards designed for the GS did not fit in the Apple IIe's slanted case. In the end, most users found that the upgrade did not save them much money once they purchased a 3.5-inch floppy drive, analog RGB monitor, and mouse.

== Software features ==
Software that runs on the Apple IIGS can be divided into two major categories: 8-bit software compatible with earlier Apple II systems such as the IIe and IIc, and 16-bit IIGS software, which takes advantage of its advanced features, including a near-clone of the Macintosh graphical user interface.

=== 8-bit Apple II compatibility ===
Apple claimed that the IIGS was more than 99% compatible with contemporary Apple II software. One reviewer, for example, successfully ran demo programs that came on cassette with his 1977 Apple II. The IIGS can run all of Apple's earlier Apple II operating systems: Apple DOS, ProDOS 8, and Apple Pascal. It is also compatible with nearly all 8-bit software running on those systems. Like the Apple II+, IIe, and IIc, the IIGS also includes Applesoft BASIC and a machine-language monitor (which can be used for very simple assembly language programming) in ROM, so they can be used even with no operating system loaded from disk. The 8-bit software runs nearly three times as fast unless the user turns down the processor speed in the IIGS control panel.

=== System software ===
Early versions of the system software are based on the ProDOS 16 operating system, which is based on the original ProDOS operating system for 8-bit Apple II computers. ProDOS 16 is written largely in 8-bit code and does not take full advantage of the IIGS's capabilities. Starting with System Software version 4.0, ProDOS 16 was replaced with a 16-bit operating system: GS/OS.

The IIGS System Software was enhanced and expanded, culminating in its final official version, System 6.0.1, released in 1993. In July 2015, members of a computer group from France released an unofficial version dubbed "System 6.0.2" (and later followed by System 6.0.3 and 6.0.4), that primarily fixed bugs.

=== Graphical user interface ===
The IIGS provides a mouse-driven graphical user interface similar to that of the Macintosh. This is implemented by a "toolbox" of code, some of which resides in the computer's ROM and some of which is loaded from disk. Only one major application can run at a time. Smaller programs, known as Desk Accessories, can be used simultaneously. (a distinction which originated on the Mac). The IIGS has a Finder file manager application very similar to the Mac, for manipulating files and launching applications. By default, the Finder is displayed when the computer starts up and whenever the user quits an application started from it. The startup application can be changed by the user.

=== Multitasking ===
GNO/ME, a third party UNIX-like kernel, was sold from 1991 through mid-1996. It run under the GUI and provides preemptive multitasking. The Manager, by Brainstorm Software and published through Seven Hills, was a MultiFinder-like add-on sold from 1993 to 1995. It was used to make the Finder more like the one on the Macintosh, allowing major software (other than just the "accessory" programs) to run simultaneously through cooperative multitasking.

== Reception ==
After previewing the computer, BYTE stated in October 1986 that "The Apple IIGS designers' achievements are remarkable, but the burden of the classic Apple II architecture, now as venerable (and outdated) as COBOL and batch processing, may have weighed them down and denied them any technological leaps beyond an exercise in miniaturization." The magazine added that "hog-tied by [classic] Apple II compatibility, [the IIGS] approaches but does not match or exceed current computer capabilities" of the Macintosh, Amiga, or Atari ST, and predicted that many vendors would "enhance existing products for the [classic] Apple II instead of writing new software" that fully exploited the IIGS's power.

inCider, which in September had warned that the next Apple II "needs (at least) ... a megabyte of RAM ... That's what the market wants", indeed reported in November that "Rather than risk investing time and money in programs that work only on the Apple IIGS, a number of software developers have simply upgraded old Apple II programs", and that the "most interesting program available specifically for the IIGS at this time is LearningWays' Explore-a-Story, which was released simultaneously for the good old 128K Apple IIe and IIc". The magazine concluded, "The moral is simple: Good hardware, even innovative hardware, won't give birth to good, new software overnight." By 1988 the magazine reported that the IIgs was only the fourth-fastest Apple II, after the Apple IIc Plus, Laser 128EX/2, and IIe with Zip Chip.

Nibble was more positive, calling the price "fantastic" for "Steve Wozniak's dream machine". It praised the IIGS's "incredible" legacy Apple II compatibility, graphics, and sound, stated that only its slower speed made the computer significantly inferior to the Macintosh, and expected that Apple would soon introduce new products to better distinguish the two product lines. The magazine concluded that "The IIGS is an incredibly fine computer, arguably the finest assemblage of chips and resistors ever soldered together ... Ladies and gentlemen of Apple, on behalf of the Apple II user community, you have earned our gratitude and admiration."

Compute! described the IIGS in November 1986 as "two machines in one—a product that bridges the gap between the Macintosh and Apple IIe, and in so doing poses what may be serious competition for the Commodore Amiga and the Atari ST series". It described the IIGS's graphics "as different as night and day" from the earlier Apple IIs and the audio as "in a class by themselves ... [it] justifies the price of the IIGS to many music fans and fanatics". The magazine reported that "well over one hundred outside developers were actively engaged in creating software for the IIGS", and predicted that "as new products are developed to take advantage of the IIGS, people will move away from the pure Apple II and toward the newer titles with their improved performance".

Compute!'s Apple Applications in December 1987 reported, however, that "Many publishers have canceled or postponed their plans for Apple IIGS software and instead are cautiously introducing programs for the Apple IIc and IIe", while "many of the products for the Apple IIGS are simply versions of" older Apple II software "that incorporate color and use the mouse interface". So little IIGS software was available, it said, that "the hottest product ... is AppleWorks. No mouse interface, no color, no graphics. Just AppleWorks from the IIe and IIc world". The magazine stated that many customers either chose the slightly more expensive Macintosh Plus or kept their inexpensive IIc or IIe which ran AppleWorks well, with the IIGS "in a strange position" in between.

BYTE's Bruce Webster wrote in the in January 1987 issue:

The IIGS is an excellent replacement for the Apple II line, but it's awfully late in coming. The technology is more trailing edge than leading edge in many areas. In terms of graphics performance, the IIGS is already behind the Atari ST and the Amiga, both of which are less expensive and both of which have more software taking advantage of their graphics. The IIGS doesn't leap very far ahead.

Webster found that a IIGS package costing $2,500 was comparable to a $1,500 Atari ST configuration. He concluded with a "qualified approval" of the computer: "It was necessary to prevent the Apple II line from dying off during the next year or so. However, Apple didn't go far enough".

A BYTE review in April 1987 concluded that the IIGS "has the potential to be a powerful computer" but needed a faster CPU and more addressable memory. The magazine advised potential customers to compare the Macintosh, Amiga, and Atari ST's more powerful 68000 CPU with the IIGS's greater expandability and large Apple II software library.

Compute! in 1988 urged Apple to make the computer faster, stating that "no matter which way you cut it, the IIGS is slow" and that IIGS-specific programs could not keep up with user actions. In 1989 the magazine stated "One of the biggest complaints of IIGS-specific software is the way it imitates the pace of a zombie. You'd think 16-bit software had died and voodoo-transformed into a shuffling, stumbling imitation of real computer applications." It reported that year that after increases in September, a IIGS with color monitor, two disk drives, and ImageWriter II cost more than $3,000, a price the magazine called "staggering". inCider also criticized the price increase, warning that it "opens the door further to low-cost MS-DOS computers".

Some software companies complained that Apple did not provide technical information and development tools to create IIGS-specific software. In 1988 Compute! reported that both Cinemaware and Intergalactic Development had to write their own tools to maximize their use of IIGS audio, with the latter stating that "these sorts of problems … are becoming well-known throughout the industry".

== Technical specifications ==
=== Microprocessor ===
- WDC 65C816 running at 2.8 MHz
- 8-bit data bus, with selectable 8 or 16-bit registers
- 24-bit memory addressing

=== Memory ===
- 256 KB, 512 KB or 1 megabyte of RAM, depending on year of release, expandable to 8 MB
- 128 KB or 256 KB ROM

=== Video modes ===
==== Emulation video ====
- 40 and 80 column text, with 24 lines
- Low resolution: 40×48 (16 colors)
- High resolution: 280×192 (6 colors)
- Double low resolution: 80×48 (16 colors)
- Double high resolution: 560×192 (16 colors)

==== Native video ====
- 40- and 80-column text, with 24 lines (16 selectable foreground, background, and border colors)
- Super-high resolution (320 mode)
  - 320×200 (16 colors, selectable from 4,096 color palette)
  - 320×200 (256 colors, selectable from 4,096 color palette)
  - 320×200 (3,200 colors, selectable from 4,096 color palette)
- Super-high resolution (640 mode)
  - 640×200 (4 colors, selectable from 4,096 color palette)
  - 640×200 (16 dithered colors, selectable from 4,096 color palette)
  - 640×200 (64 colors, selectable from 4,096 color palette)
  - 640×200 (800 colors, selectable from 4,096 color palette)
- Fill mode
  - 320×200: pixels to the right of a non-zero color are displayed in that color until another non-zero pixel is reached
- Mixed mode
  - 320/640×200, horizontal resolution selectable per line

=== Audio ===
- Ensoniq 5503 digital oscillator chip
  - 8-bit audio resolution
  - 64 KB of dedicated sound RAM
  - 32 oscillator channels (16 voices when paired)
  - Support for eight independent stereo speaker channels

=== Expansion ===
- Seven Apple II Bus slots (50-pin card-edge)
- IIGS Memory Expansion slot (44-pin card-edge)

=== Internal connectors ===
- Game I/O socket (16-pin DIP)
- Ensoniq I/O expansion connector (7-pin Molex)

=== Specialized chip controllers ===
- IWM (Integrated Woz Machine) for floppy drives
- VGC (video graphics controller) for video
- Mega II (Apple IIe computer on chip)
- Ensoniq 5503 DOC (sample-based synthesis)
- Zilog Z8530 SCC (serial port controller)
- Apple Desktop Bus microcontroller
- FPI (Fast Processor Interface) or CYA (Control Your Apple)

=== External connectors ===
- NTSC composite video output (RCA connector)
- Joystick (DE-9)
- Audio-out (1/8-inch mono phono jack)
- Printer-serial 1 (mini-DIN8)
- Modem-serial 2 (mini-DIN8)
- Floppy drive (D-19)
- Analog RGB video (DA-15)
- Apple Desktop Bus (mini-DIN4)

== Revision history ==
While in production between September 1986 and December 1992, the Apple IIGS remained relatively unchanged from its inception. During those years, however, Apple did produce some maintenance updates to the system which mainly comprised two new ROM-based updates and a revamped motherboard.

=== Original firmware release ("ROM version 00") ===
During the entire first year of the machine's production, an early, almost beta-like, firmware version shipped with the machine and was notably bug-ridden. Some limitations of this include the fact that the built-in RAM Disk can't be set larger than 4 MB (even if more RAM is present) and the firmware contains the very early System 1.x toolsets. It became incompatible with most native Apple IIGS software written from late-1987 onward, and OS support only lasted up to System 3. The startup splash screen of the original ROM only displays the words "Apple IIgs" at the top center of the screen, in the same fashion that previous Apple II models identify themselves.

=== Video Graphics Controller (VGC) replacement ===
Very early production runs of the machine had a faulty video graphics controller (VGC) chip that produced strange cosmetic glitches in emulated (IIe/IIc) video modes. Specifically, the 80-column text display and monochrome double-high-resolution graphics had a symptom wherein small flickering or static pink bits would appear between the gaps of characters and pixels. Most users noticed this when using AppleWorks classic or the Mousedesk application that was a part of System 1 and 2. Apple resolved the issue by offering a free chip-swap upgrade to affected owners.

=== Second firmware release ("ROM version 01") ===
In August 1987, Apple released an updated ROM that was included in all new machines and was made available as a free upgrade to all existing owners. The main feature of the new ROM was the presence of the System 2.x toolsets and several bug fixes. The upgrade was vital, as software developers, including Apple, ceased support of the original ROM upon its release (most native Apple IIGS software written from late 1987 onwards would not run unless ROM 01 or higher was present, and this included the GS/OS operating system). This update also allows up to 8 MB for the RAM Disk, added some new features for programmers, and reported the ROM version and copyright information on the startup splash screen.

=== Standard RAM increased to 512 KB ===
In March 1988, Apple began shipping IIGS units with 512 KB of RAM as standard. This was done by preinstalling the Apple IIGS Memory Expansion Card (that was once sold separately) in the memory expansion slot—the card had 256 KB of RAM on board with empty sockets for further expansion. The built-in memory on the motherboard remained at 256 KB and existing users were not offered this upgrade.

=== Third firmware release ("ROM version 3"); 1 MB of RAM ===
In August 1989, Apple increased the standard amount of RAM shipped in the IIGS to 1.125 MB. This time the additional memory was built-in on the motherboard, which required a layout change and allowed for other minor improvements as well. This update introduced both a new motherboard and a new ROM firmware update; however, neither was offered to existing owners—even as an upgrade option (the new ROM, now two chips, is incompatible with the original single-socket motherboard). Apple had cited the reason an upgrade was not being offered was that most of the features of the new machine could be obtained in existing machines by installing System 5 and a fully populated Apple IIGS Memory Expansion Card.

The new ROM firmware was expanded to 256 KB and contained the System 5.x toolsets. The newer toolsets increased the performance of the machine by up to 10%, due to the fact that less had to be loaded from disk, tool ROM read access being faster than RAM, and their highly optimized routines compared to the older toolsets (pre-GS/OS-based). In addition to several bug fixes, also added were more programmer assistance commands and features, a cleaned-up control panel with improved mouse control and RAM Disk functionality, more flexible Appletalk support and slot-mapping.

In terms of hardware, the new motherboard is a cleaner design that drew less power and resolved audio noise issues that interfered with the Ensoniq synthesizer in the original motherboard. Over four times more RAM is built-in, with double the ROM size, and an enhanced Apple Desktop Bus microcontroller provides native support for sticky keys, mouse emulation, and keyboard LED support (available on extended keyboards). Hardware shadowing of Text Page 2 was introduced, improving compatibility and performance with the classic Apple II video mode. The clock battery is now user-serviceable, being placed in a removable socket, and a jumper location was added to lock out the text-based control panel (mainly useful in school environments). Support for the Apple-IIe-to-IIGS upgrade was removed, and some cost-cutting measures had some chips soldered in place rather than being socketed. As the firmware only worked in this motherboard and no new firmware updates were ever issued, users commonly referred to this version of the IIGS as the "ROM 3".

== International versions ==
Like the Apple IIe and Apple IIc built-in keyboards before it, the detached IIGS keyboard differs depending on what region of the world it was sold in, with extra local language characters and symbols printed on certain keycaps (e.g. French accented characters on the Canadian IIGS keyboard such as "à", "é", "ç", etc., or the British Pound "£" symbol on the UK IIGS keyboard). Unlike previous Apple II models, however, the layout and shape of keys were the same standard for all countries, and the ROMs inside the computer were also the same for all countries, including support for all the different international keyboards. In order to access the local character set layout and display, users would change settings in the built-in software-based control panel, which also provides a method of toggling between 50/60 Hz video screen refresh. The composite video output is NTSC-only on all IIGS systems; users in PAL countries are expected to use an RGB monitor or TVs which featured RGB SCART. This selectable internationalization makes it quick and simple to localize any given machine. Also present in the settings is a QWERTY/DVORAK keyboard toggle for all countries, much like that of the Apple IIc. Outside North America, the Apple IIGS shipped with a different 220 V clip-in power supply, making this and the plastic keycaps the only physical differences (and also very modular, in the sense of converting a non-localized machine to a local one).

== Legacy ==
The Apple Desktop Bus, which for a long time was the standard for most input peripherals for the Macintosh, first appeared on the IIGS. In addition, the other standardized ports and addition of SCSI set a benchmark which allowed Apple, for the first time, to consolidate their peripheral offerings across both the Apple II and Macintosh product lines, permitting one device to be compatible with multiple, disparate computers.

The IIGS is also the first Apple product to bear the new color scheme associated with the brand, a warm gray color Apple dubbed "Platinum". This color would remain the Apple standard used on the vast majority of products for the next decade. The IIGS is also the second major computer design, after the Apple IIc, where Apple worked with Hartmut Esslinger's team at Frog Design. The new corporate color and matching peripherals were used consistently, beginning the Snow White design language. The Snow White design language was used exclusively for the next five years.

The inclusion of a professional-grade sound chip in the Apple IIGS was hailed by both developers and users, and hopes were high that it would be added to the Macintosh; however, it drew another lawsuit from Apple Corps. As part of an earlier trademark dispute with the business arm of The Beatles, Apple Computer had agreed not to release music-related products. Apple Corps considered the inclusion of the Ensoniq chip in the IIGS a violation of that agreement.

=== Developers ===
John Carmack, co-founder of id Software, started his career by writing commercial software for the Apple IIGS, working with John Romero and Tom Hall. Wolfenstein 3D, based on the 1981 Apple II game Castle Wolfenstein, came full-circle when it was released for the Apple IIGS in 1998.

Two mainstream video games, Zany Golf and The Immortal, both designed by Will Harvey, originated as Apple IIGS games that were ported to other platforms, including the Sega Genesis.

Pangea Software started as an Apple IIGS game developer. Naughty Dog's first published game was for the 8-bit Apple II; the company later developed for the IIGS.

=== Gus ===
Apple designed the Apple IIe Card to transit Apple IIe customers to the Macintosh LC, particularly schools who had a large investment in Apple II software. While Apple discussed creating an LC plug-in IIGS card, they felt that the cost of selling it would be as much as an entire LC and abandoned it. However, the educational community had a substantial investment in the IIGS software as well, which made upgrading to a Macintosh a less attractive proposition than had been for the Apple IIe. As a result, Apple software designers Dave Lyons and Andy Nicholas spearheaded a program to develop a IIGS software emulator they called Gus in their spare time, which would run on the Power Macintosh only. Apple did not officially support the project. Nevertheless, seeing the need to help switch their educational customers to the Macintosh (as well as sell Power Macs), Apple unofficially distributed the software for free to schools and other institutions that signed a non-disclosure agreement. It was never offered for public sale, but is now readily available on the internet, along with many third-party classic Apple II emulators. Gus represents one of the few software emulators developed within Apple (officially or otherwise), including MacWorks and Mac OS X Classic environment. The app was publicly demonstrated in Rhapsody's Blue Box at WWDC 1997.

== Rumors and canceled developments ==
The "Mark Twain" prototype (named for Twain's quote "The reports of my death are greatly exaggerated") was expected to have the "ROM 04" revision (although prototypes that have been discovered do not contain any new ROM code) and included an 8 MHz 65C816, built-in SuperDrive, 2 MB of RAM, and a hard drive.

In August 1988, inCider magazine reported Apple was working on a new Apple IIGS. It was stated it had a faster CPU, improved graphics (double the vertical resolution, 256 colors per scanline and 4,096 colors per screen), 768 KB of RAM, 256 KB of ROM, 128 KB of sound DOC-RAM and a built-in SCSI port. No new machine would appear that year.

In 1989 Compute! reported on speculation that Apple would announce at the May AppleFest a "IIGS Plus" with a processor two to three times faster, 768 KB to 1 MB RAM, and a SCSI port. The speculation was partially based on Apple CEO John Sculley stating that the IIGS would receive a new CPU in 1989. No new computer appeared, but in August, the IIGS started shipping with 1 MB RAM in the base configuration.

VTech, makers of the 8-bit Apple II-compatible Laser 128, announced plans for a IIGS-compatible computer in 1988 for under $600. They demonstrated a prototype in 1989, but the computer was never released.

Cirtech produced a working prototype of a black-and-white Macintosh hardware emulation plug-in card for the IIGS dubbed "Duet". Using a 68020 processor, custom ROM and up to 8 MB RAM, Cirtech claimed it outperformed the Macintosh IIcx. The project was ultimately canceled due to the projected high cost of the board.

Timeline of Apple II family
See also: Timeline of the Apple II series, Timeline of Macintosh models, and Timeline of Apple Inc. products

== See also ==
- Apple IIc Plus
- Juiced.GS, the last Apple II publication
- KansasFest, an annual convention for Apple II users
- List of Apple IIGS games
