= GNO/ME =

GNO Multitasking Environment
- Developer: Procyon Enterprises, Devin Reade
- OS family: Unix-like
- Source model: Open source
- Initial release: 1991; 34 years ago
- Latest release: 2.0.6 / February 15, 1999; 26 years ago
- Repository: https://github.com/GnoConsortium/gno
- Marketing target: Personal computing
- Platforms: Apple IIGS
- License: Freeware
- Official website: www.gno.org/gno

The GNO Multitasking Environment, also known as GNO/ME or GNO for short, is a Unix-like operating system for the Apple IIGS computer. It was developed by Procyon Enterprises and sold commercially from 1991 through August 1996, when it was released as freeware. Development continued by Devin Reade, who released the current version 2.0.6 on 15 February 1999. The source code has since been released via GitHub.
