= Apple IIc Plus =

Personal computer by Apple

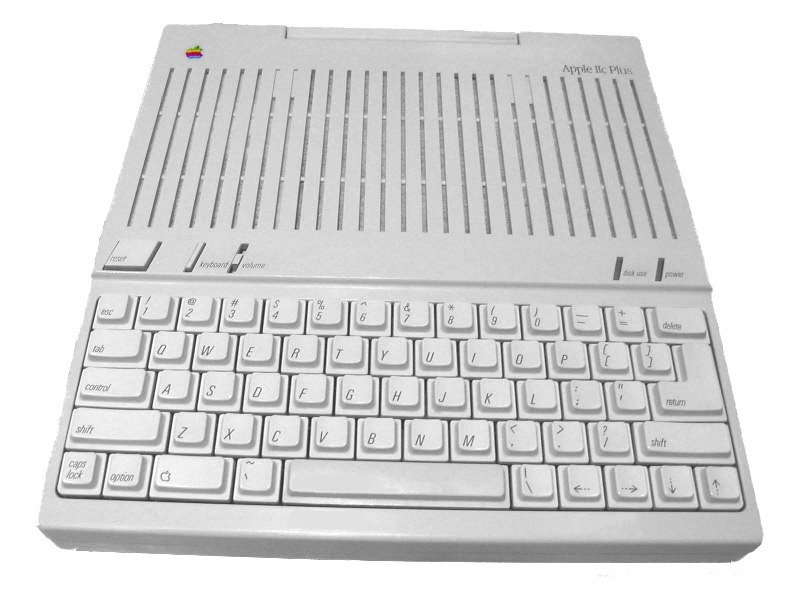
- Manufacturer: Apple Computer, Inc.
- Product family: Apple II
- Released: September 16, 1988; 38 years ago
- Introductory price: US$675 (equivalent to $1,840 in 2025)
- Discontinued: November 1990
- Operating system: ProDOS
- CPU: 65C02 @ 4 MHz
- Memory: 128 KB (up to 1.125 MB)
- Removable storage: 3 1/2-inch 800K floppy disk
- Display: NTSC video out (built-in RCA connector) and DA-15 connector
- Sound: 1-bit speaker (built-in)
- Dimensions: 2.5 × 12 × 11.5 in (6.4 × 30.5 × 29.2 cm)
- Weight: 7 lb (3.2 kg)
- Predecessor: Apple IIc
- Related: Apple IIe

The Apple IIc Plus is the sixth and final personal computer in the Apple II series from Apple Computer. The "Plus" in the name references features not present in the original portable Apple IIc: a built-in, higher capacity 3 1/2-inch floppy drive (replacing the 5 1/4-inch drive); increased processing speed; and a standardization of the system components. The Apple IIc Plus, for the most part, did not introduce new technology or evolutionary contributions to the Apple II series, but instead integrated existing peripherals into the original Apple IIc design. The model was discontinued in 1990.

== History ==
By 1988 the Laser 128 series of Apple II clones was popular enough that it had, inCider wrote, "won a place in the Apple market, and irritated Apple in the process". The 128 sold for about $300 less than the Apple IIc. The Apple IIc Plus was introduced on September 16, 1988, at the AppleFest conference in San Francisco, with less fanfare than the IIc had received four years earlier. Described as little more than a "turbocharged version of the IIc with a high-capacity 3½ disk drive" by one magazine review of the time, some users were disappointed. Many IIc users already had add-ons giving them something rather close to what the new model offered.

Before the official release of the machine, it had been rumored to be a slotless version of the Apple IIGS in the compact case of the Apple IIc. Apple employee John Arkley, one of the engineers working on the Apple IIc Plus project, had devised rudimentary plans for an enhanced Apple IIGS motherboard that would fit in the IIc case, and petitioned management for the go-ahead with such a project; the idea was rejected.

Apple priced the IIc Plus much more aggressively than it had the IIc; it was only $126 more expensive than the Laser 128EX/2. When the project started the original plan was to just replace the 5 1/4-inch floppy drive with a 3 1/2-inch, without modifying the IIc design. Other features, consequently, were added as the project progressed. It is believed the Apple IIc Plus design, and its existence at all, was influenced by the Laser 128. The Apple IIc Plus is very similar in design to the Laser 128EX/2 model, released shortly before the Apple IIc Plus. As it was fully backwards-compatible, the Apple IIc Plus replaced the Apple IIc.

Codenames for the machine while under development included: Raisin, Pizza, and Adam Ant.

== Overview ==
=== Major new features ===
The Apple IIc Plus introduced several major hardware changes compared with the IIc.

The most noticeable change is the replacement of the 5 1/4-inch floppy drive with a 3 1/2-inch drive. Besides offering nearly six times the storage capacity (800 KB vs 140 KB), the new drive has a much faster seek time (three times faster) and button-activated motorized ejection. To accommodate the increased data flow of the new drive, specialized chip circuitry called the MIG, an acronym for "Magic Interface Glue", was designed and added to the motherboard along with a dedicated 2 KB static RAM buffer.

The computer used a WDC 65C02 processor running at 4 MHz, it made the computer faster than any other Apple II, including the IIGS. Apple licensed the Zip Chip Apple II accelerator, from third-party developer Zip Technologies, for the IIc Plus. However, instead of the all-in-one tall chip design used by Zip, Apple engineers broke out the design into its core components and integrated them into the motherboard (a 4 MHz CPU, 8 KB of combined static RAM cache, and logic). Apple stated its performance as three times faster (3.3 times according to benchmarks) than any other 8-bit Apple II. The CPU acceleration was a last-minute feature addition, which in turn made the specialized circuitry for the use of a 3 1/2-inch drive unnecessary at full CPU speed as the machine was now fast enough to handle the data flow; that circuitry was left in place and put into operation nonetheless to support 1 MHz mode. By default the machine rus at 4 MHz, but holding down the 'ESC' key during a cold or warm boot disables the acceleration so it can run at a standard 1 MHz. This is necessary for older software that depends on timing, especially games.

The power supply was also miniaturized by Sony and placed inside the computer's case, replacing the external power brick used by the Apple IIc.

=== Cosmetic and minor changes ===
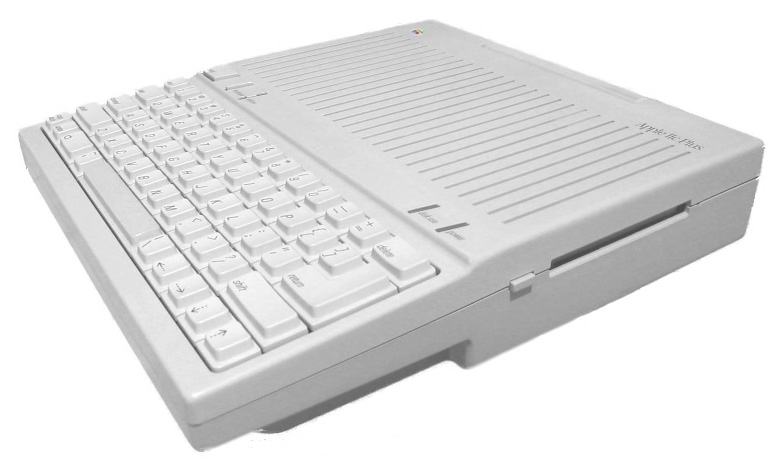
Along its right side is the opening for the built-in 3 1/2-inch floppy drive, which replaced the older 5 1/4-inch drive.

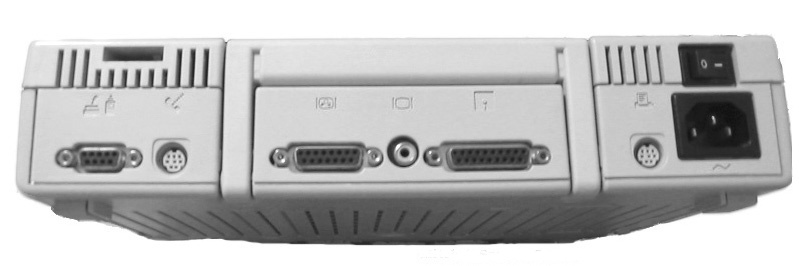
The rear expansion ports. Note the standard AC-power connector and smaller mini DIN-8 serial ports.

The Apple IIc Plus had several cosmetic changes. Its revised keyboard closely followed the layout of the Apple IIGS, Platinum Apple IIe, and Macintosh. The "Solid Apple" key was re-positioned, enlarged and relabeled "Option", while documentation renamed the "Open Apple" key "Command" without changing its icon. The keyboard also featured a larger, reversed L-shaped "Return" key. A sliding volume control replaces the "40/80" column switch above the keyboard. The audio headphone jack found on the Apple IIc was removed to reduce costs. Both the case and keyboard changed to Apple's light gray Platinum color scheme, creating a seamless visual blend between the two. At 7 pounds (3.2 kg), the computer was half a pound lighter than the original IIc.

The rear panel includes a three-prong AC power connector and a power switch in place of the earlier voltage converter input. A security lock slot was also added to the rear, at the opposite side. For standardization, the serial ports changed from DIN-5 to mini-DIN-8 connectors, but retain the same signals. Most built-in peripheral functions and ports of the IIc remained, but the floppy disk interface was upgraded. It supports the external Apple 3.5 Drive used by the Apple IIGS and Macintosh, as well as up to two external 5 1/4-inch floppy drives. The original IIc only supported one external 5 1/4-inch drive and, on later models, intelligent storage devices such as the UniDisk 3.5.

Internally, the motherboard included a connector for an internal modem, although no products used it. A memory expansion socket originally introduced in a late Apple IIc motherboard revision was retained, but it is incompatible with memory cards designed for earlier models due to timing issues. The ROM firmware was designated revision 5, following the original IIc's revision sequence, and remained the same size. RAM capacity also remained unchanged at 128 KB.

== Reception ==
inCider in November 1988 found that the Apple IIc Plus was faster than a IIGS, Laser 128EX/2, or Apple IIe with a Zip Chip. It favorably cited the improved keyboard, internal power supply, and Macintosh/IIGS-compatible serial port, but said that the computer "isn't everything it could be", criticizing the lack of change from the IIc's memory capacity ("128K doesn't quite cut it") and difficulty in adding more. The magazine concluded, "It's disappointing that a company as technologically sophisticated as Apple couldn't have gone a step further ... The IIc Plus is a nice system, but it's too little, too late". A separate editorial in the issue began "What if you announced a new computer and nobody cared? Apple Computer could be facing such a dilemma". Even with an accompanying price increase for the IIGS, the magazine stated that "unless you really want a small, easily transportable computer, there's little reason to buy the IIc Plus over the IIGS ... the improvements over the IIc simply aren't that significant". Regarding the 3 1/2-inch drive the magazine stated, "there are thousands of good, affordable programs that won't be released in 3 1/2-inch format ... bargain hunters will want access to classic educational and entertainment programs that are available only on 5 1/4-inch disks". While praising Apple for continuing to support Apple II owners the editorial criticized the company for announcing "a new product that uses old technology" at a price higher than that of the Laser 128 EX/2 or an inexpensive PC clone, comparing the IIc Plus to the unsuccessful IBM PCjr. It concluded that "the IIc Plus simply clouds the Apple II picture".

== Technical specifications ==
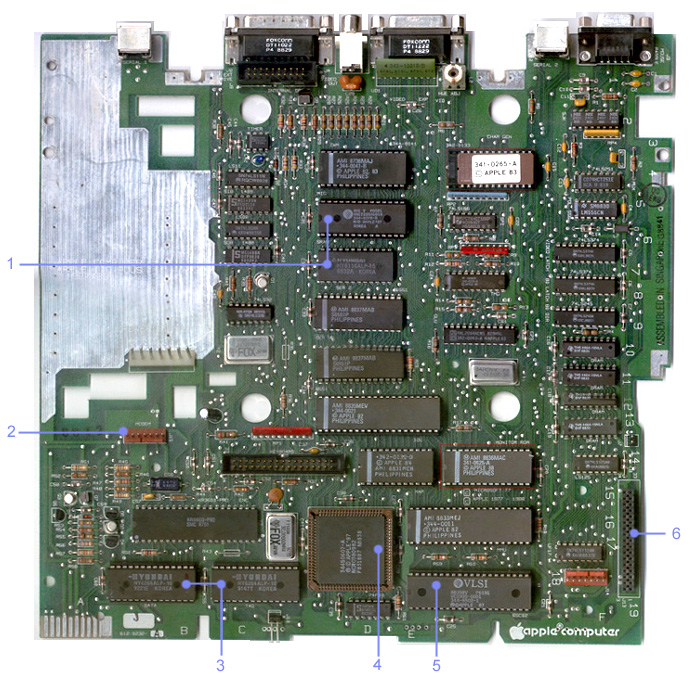
An Apple IIc Plus motherboard, normally inaccessible in the closed system.: Legend: (1) MIG and its 2 KB SRAM; (2) Internal modem connector; (3) Dual 8 KB cache for CPU; (4) Accelerator ASIC; (5) 4 MHz 65C02 CPU; (6) Memory expansion connector

=== Microprocessor ===
- 65C02 running at either 1 MHz or 4 MHz (user-selectable)
- 8 KB SRAM cache (16 KB physical installed; 8 KB for TAG/DATA)
- 8-bit data bus

=== Memory ===
- 128 KB RAM built-in
  - Expandable from 128 KB to 1.125 MB RAM
- 32 KB ROM built-in

=== Video ===
- 40 and 80 columns text, with 24 lines. Text can be mixed with graphic modes, replacing either bottom 8 or 32 lines, depending on video mode.
- Low-Resolution: 40 × 48 (16 colors)
- High-Resolution: 280 × 192 (6 colors) *
- Double-Low-Resolution: 80 × 48 (16 colors)
- Double-High-Resolution: 560 × 192 (16 colors) *

*effectively 140 × 192 in color, due to pixel placement restrictions

=== Audio ===
- Built-in speaker; 1-bit toggling
- User-adjustable volume (slider switch)

=== Built-in storage ===
- Internal 3 1/2-inch floppy drive
  - 800 KB, double-sided
  - Motorized ejection/auto-injection

=== Internal connectors ===
- IIc Plus Memory Expansion Card (34-pin)
- Modem (7-pin)

=== Specialized chip controllers ===
- IWM (Integrated Woz Machine) for floppy drives
- MIG (Magic Interface Glue) with 2 KB SRAM, for "dumb" 3 1/2-inch floppy drive support
- Dual 6551 ACIA chips for serial I/O

=== External connectors ===
- Joystick/mouse (DE-9)
- 2 × serial (mini-DIN-8), labeled printer and modem
- Video expansion (DA-15) (Note: Although this was the same connector used to connect monitors to the Apple IIGS, Apple III, and Macintosh, the port on the Apple IIc and IIc Plus port did not carry analog RGB signals. Instead, it provided raw video timing, composite NTSC video, audio output, and a +12 V power supply. It was intended to be used to connect video conversion devices.)
- Floppy drive SmartPort (D-19)
- Composite video output (RCA connector, NTSC)

== Notes of interest ==
=== Revisions ===
The Apple IIc Plus had a relatively short product lifespan, produced for only two years (it was officially discontinued in November 1990). Though for many years it was believed that there had been no changes or revisions made to the machine, in 2008 hobbyists discovered the existence of two versions of the motherboard. While the revised board contained several minor differences (mainly different ASIC manufacturers and markings), there were no updates or bug fixes seen in the firmware (which was still identified as ROM version '5').

=== No international versions ===
There were also no international versions of the Apple IIc Plus produced, so the keyboard, unlike the original IIc, was only manufactured with American English printed keycaps and the 'Keyboard' switch was utilized solely for changing between QWERTY and Dvorak layout (rather than localized keyboard layouts). Consequently, the Apple IIc Plus was only sold in the U.S. — not even Canadian Apple dealers were authorized to distribute or sell it.

== End of the line ==
As the 1980s drew to a close, the introduction of the Apple IIc Plus generated ambivalence among Apple II users and within the computer industry. While Apple demonstrated a continued commitment to the Apple II line by releasing a new model, it also displayed a confusing shift backward with a return to 8-bit development. Users expected a new Apple IIGS model to continue the line’s 16-bit evolution. Despite this unexpected detour, anticipation remained high that more Apple II models would follow.

The following year, Apple released a maintenance update of the existing Apple IIGS, but it was fundamentally the same computer, and no motherboard upgrade was offered. Apple continued the manufacture, sale, and support of the Apple II line well into the early 1990s, but despite promises of new models, none appeared. Though unintended, the Apple IIc Plus became the final new Apple II model, marking the end of the line.

Timeline of Apple II family
See also: Timeline of the Apple II series, Timeline of Macintosh models, and Timeline of Apple Inc. products

== See also ==
- List of Apple II games
- List of publications and periodicals devoted to the Apple II
- Apple II peripheral cards
