= Timeline of the Apple II series =

Computer timeline

This timeline of Apple II family models lists all models Apple II computers produced by Apple Computer in order of introduction date. The Apple I and Apple III are included, because of their relevance to the Apple II.

Timeline of Apple II family
See also: Timeline of the Apple II series, Timeline of Macintosh models, and Timeline of Apple Inc. products

== Detailed timeline ==
Launched	Model	Family	US Introductory Price	Processor	Built-in RAM	Best graphics	Discontinued
April 11, 1976	Apple I	Apple I	$666.66	6502	4-8 KiB	40x24 characters monochrome	September 30, 1977
June 1, 1977	Apple II	Apple II	$1298	6502	4-48 KiB	280x192 6 colors	June 1, 1979
June 1, 1979	Apple II Plus	Apple II	$1195	6502	16-48 KiB	280x192 6 colors	December 1, 1982
June 1, 1979	Apple II EuroPlus	Apple II		6502	16-48 KiB	280x192 6 colors	December 1, 1982
June 1, 1979	Apple II J-Plus	Apple II		6502	16-48 KiB	280x192 6 colors	December 1, 1982
June 1, 1979	Bell & Howell	Apple II		6502	16-48 KiB	280x192 6 colors	December 1, 1982
November 1, 1980	Apple III	Apple III	$4380	6502A	128 KiB	560x192 monochrome 280x192 16 colors	December 1, 1981
December 1, 1981	Apple III Revised	Apple III	$3495	6502A	256 KiB	560x192 monochrome 280x192 16 colors	December 1, 1983
January 1, 1983	Apple IIe	Apple II	$1395	6502	64 KiB	560x192 16 colors	March 1, 1985
December 1, 1983	Apple III Plus	Apple III	$2995	6502A	256 KiB	560x192 monochrome 280x192 16 colors	April 1, 1984
April 1, 1984	Apple IIc	Apple II	$1295	65C02	128 KiB	560x192 16 colors	August 1, 1988
March 1, 1985	Apple IIe Enhanced	Apple II		65C02	64 KiB	560x192 16 colors	January 1, 1987
September 15, 1986	Apple IIGS	Apple II	$999	65C816	256 KiB	640x200 800 colors	October 1, 1989
September 15, 1986	Apple IIc Memory Expansion	Apple II			128 KiB	560x192 16 colors	September 1, 1988
July 1, 1987	Apple IIe Platinum	Apple II		65C02	128 KiB	560x192 16 colors	November 1, 1993
September 1, 1988	Apple IIc Plus	Apple II	$675	65C02	128 KiB	560x192 16 colors	September 1, 1990
October 1, 1989	Apple IIGS (1 MB, ROM 3)	Apple II	$999	65C816	1.125 MiB	640x200 800 colors	December 1, 1992
March 1, 1991	Apple IIe Card	Apple II	$250	65C02	256 KiB (128 KiB usable)		May 1, 1995

== See also ==
- Timeline of Apple products – includes complete list of Apple II family peripherals and software sold by Apple
- Timeline of Macintosh models
