= Mega II =

Custom chip from Apple Computer

A "Gemini" chip, a modified variant of the Mega II

The Mega II is a custom integrated circuit developed by Apple Computer that integrates most of the circuitry of an Apple IIe into a single chip. It was used in at least three Apple products between 1986 and 1995, most notably and predominantly in the Apple IIGS computer. A heavily modified version, known as the "Gemini" chip, was later used in the Apple IIe Card for the Macintosh. Packaged in an 84-pin plastic leaded chip carrier (PLCC), the Mega II combined functions previously handled by multiple chips, reducing component count and simplifying hardware design.

The Mega II contains the functional equivalent of an entire of an Apple IIe computer, excluding the processor, RAM and ROM. In the Apple IIGS, it worked with the 65C816 processor' 8-bit mode that emulated the earlier 65C02 processor, along with the memory and ROM of the IIGS, to maintain compatibility with software written for earlier Apple II computers. This design allowed the 16-bit IIGS to retain support for the existing 8-bit software library.

The Mega II incorporates functions equivalent to the Apple IIe's Input/Output Unit (IOU chip) and memory management unit (MMU chip), as well as video and keyboard ROMs supporting multiple display languages. It also includes a keyboard encoder and keyboard and mouse controller functions, although the latter controllers were not used in the Apple IIGS.

The chip was also used as support circuitry on the Apple II Video Overlay Card, which allowed the screen image of the Apple II to be superimposed over a video feed before being output to a display.

== History ==
In 1984, following the cancellation of the Apple IIx project, Apple engineers Dan Hillman and Jay Rickard were assigned to reduce the cost of the Apple II. They consolidated much of the computer's circuitry into a single chip, which they named Mega II. When development of the Apple IIGS began, the nearly completed Mega II design provided a foundation for compatibility with earlier 8-bit Apple II software.
