= KansasFest =

Apple II conference in the United States

- Status: Active
- Genre: Apple II
- Venue: University of Illinois
- Location: Springfield, Illinois
- Country: United States
- Inaugurated: 1989
- Most recent: 2026
- Attendance: 76 virtual in 2026
- Organizer: KansasFest Inc.
- Website: https://www.kansasfest.org/

KansasFest (also known as KFest) is an annual event for Apple II computer enthusiasts. Previously held every July at Rockhurst University in Kansas City, Missouri, but now held in Springfield, Illinois, KansasFest typically lasts five days and features presentations from Apple II experts and pioneers, as well as games, fun events, after-hours hallway chatter, late-night (or all-night) runs out to movies or restaurants, and more. A number of important new products have been released at KansasFest or developed through collaborations between individuals who likely would not have gotten together. Some of the most notable have been the introduction of the LANceGS Ethernet Card, and the Marinetti TCP/IP stack for the Apple IIGS.

Due to COVID-19, the 32nd and 33rd annual KansasFests were virtual-only, held July 24–25, 2020, and July 23–24, 2021, respectively. The 34th annual KansasFest was held July 18–23, 2023, at Rockhurst University. In March 2024, it was announced that the 35th annual KansasFest will be held July 16-21, 2024 at the University of Illinois Springfield. For 2025, KansasFest was originally planned to be held July 15–20 in Wichita, Kansas — marking the first time KansasFest would be held in Kansas — but was cancelled and transitioned to an online-only event to take place July 18-20, with the KansasFest Committee apologizing for the lack of "due diligence to ensure it met the needs of all attendees" and citing the Kansas SB 180 legislation which bans any identification of a gender other than the gender recognized at birth raising "serious concerns about the safety and inclusion of some members of our community".

The 38th KansasFest returned to the University of Illinois Springfield on July 14–19, 2026.

== History and organization ==
=== Resource Central ===
Vendor fairs were part of the earliest days of the microcomputer revolution. The Apple II had its debut at the first West Coast Computer Faire in April 1977. The popularity of this faire spawned other similar computer events elsewhere in the country. In the early 1980s, some of these vendor fairs became more computer-specific. For the Apple II computer, it began with AppleFest '81, sponsored by the Apple group in the Boston Computer Society. These festivals spread to be held in various places in the country, and Apple Computer became involved, even to the point of sending executives to give keynote addresses, and holding sessions for developers.

After the introduction of the Apple III, Lisa and Macintosh computers, Apple II users and developers were feeling increasingly isolated and ignored by Apple Computer. Tom Weishaar had started a newsletter, Open-Apple (later renamed to A2-Central) about the Apple II, and in it he provided information about the computer, how to use it, product reviews, and more. With time, he created a company named Resource Central to oversee the newsletter and other products available to sell to subscribers. Frustrated by Apple's diminishing emphasis on the Apple II, Weishaar planned a developer's conference that would specifically focus on the Apple II and Apple IIGS. The first event was held in July 1989, and was called the A2-Central Developer Conference, billed as a chance to "meet the people who will make the Apple II's future".

The conference brought together programmers, hardware developers, and Apple sent out a number of members of its Apple II group to participate in the meeting. What made it different from many similar meetings was the way in which the accommodations were handled. Resource Central, which was based in Overland Park, Kansas, arranged for the meeting and housing for many of the attendees at Avila College, a Catholic institution located in Kansas City, Missouri, not far from Overland Park. One of the unanticipated effects of this arrangement was that the college dorm environment encouraged interaction between participants in a way that would not have happened in a hotel. Nearly all who made the trip to the conference found it a significant and positive experience, and were more than ready to do it again the following year.

Resource Central continued to host these annual summer meetings, changing the name to the A2-Central Summer Conference. By the third meeting in 1991, its attendees had informally given it the name, "KansasFest", a portmanteau of "Kansas" and the "AppleFest" events held elsewhere in the country. Resource Central's sponsorship and management lasted through six KansasFest July conferences, the last being held in 1994.

=== KansasFest continues ===
Due to Apple Computer's decision to discontinue production of the Apple IIGS in late 1992 and the Apple IIe in late 1993, and the rise of the Macintosh and of computers running MS-DOS, the Apple II market began to rapidly diminish. At Resource Central, finances became a problem during 1994, and a crisis hit the company at the start of 1995. Declining renewals of the A2-Central newsletter and other products the company sold could no longer sustain the business, and it was necessary to shut down in February of that year. This put into doubt the prospects of continuing the annual KansasFest meeting. To rescue it, a committee was formed amongst previous attendees, coordinated online via GEnie. By spring of 1995 they had secured Avila for a two-day meeting, and had enough who had committed to come that KansasFest 1995 could be held.

From 1995 through 2004, KansasFest continued to be held at Avila (which changed its name to Avila University in 2002). In the earlier years, it served as an annual rallying point for the Apple II community, as it found itself in a world shrinking in resources that would support it. Like Resource Central, other businesses that dealt with the Apple II also found it difficult to survive. The online homes for direct-dial Apple II access (GEnie, CompuServe, Delphi, and America Online) were having problems with either Y2K or transition to the World Wide Web, and were phasing out their text-based access. Although the annual KansasFest event was coordinated on those online services, the physical meeting provided a recurring connection point.

By the time its second decade began in 1999, KansasFest was becoming as much about preservation of the past as it was about advancing the Apple II platform. The conference began to also have sessions covering computing on the Macintosh, Newton, and Palm computers. Attendees were often not programmers or developers, but increasingly were those who enjoyed retrocomputing or had a nostalgic connection with the Apple II. It was also a venue for demonstration of new uses for the Apple II that had never been previously considered. For example, Michael Mahon showed off his AppleCrate parallel processing Apple II in 2007, with a number of Apple IIe boards connected together, updated to a seventeen board system by the following year. A programmer, David Schmenk wrote a first-person maze game in 2007, "Escape From The Homebrew Computer Club" using 16-color lo-res graphics, something that could have been run on an Apple II in 1977 if anyone had thought of it. He demonstrated this game at KansasFest in 2011.

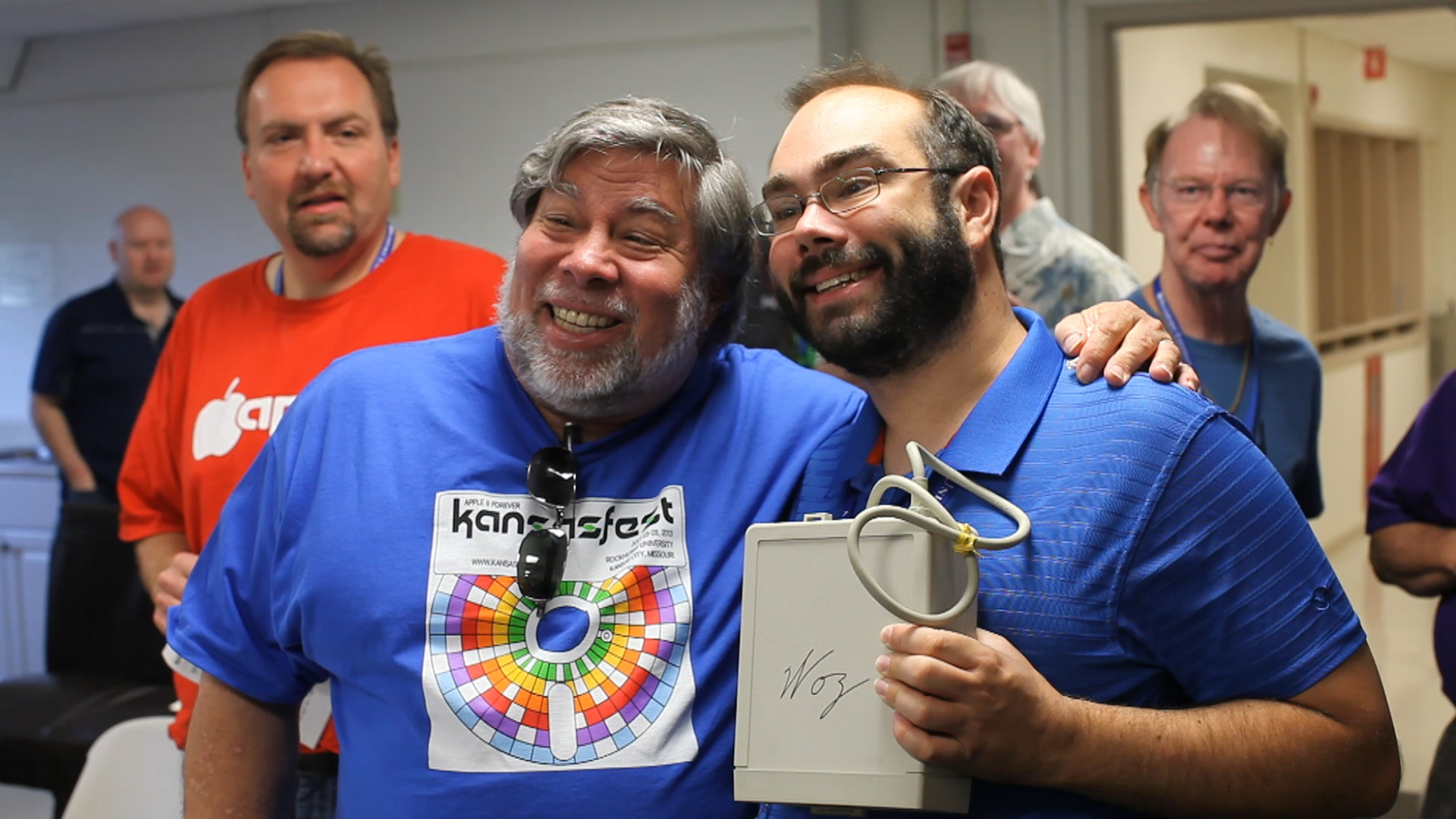
Steve Wozniak at KansasFest 2013

Furthermore, the committee began to seek out keynote speakers from outside of the immediate community, to increase interest in the event. This trend began in 2003, when Steve Wozniak agreed to speak to a turnout that was double that of the previous year. Other speakers have included David Sztela (of Nibble magazine, later employed at Apple), Lane Roathe (early Apple II game programmer), Jason Scott (digital preservationist), Mark Simonsen (of Beagle Bros), and Bob Bishop (programmer and Apple employee).

Starting in 2005, the event began to be held at a new venue, Rockhurst University, nine miles to the north of Avila, and still in Kansas City, Missouri. Though attendance reached an all-time low of 28 in 2006, it has been steadily climbing since. Fans of the Apple II computer come from all over the United States, and have come from Canada, Australia, Great Britain, France and Germany.

=== Committee / Corporation ===
From 1995 through 2014, a volunteer group each year took it upon themselves to arrange the facility for the following year's event, send out invitations, promote the event, and make sure that there were speakers, sessions, contests, and places to go outside of the meeting area.

In 2015, the committee officially incorporated KansasFest, better defining the organization in order to continue to steer the event into the future. In 2020, KansasFest became a 501(c)(3) organization (tax ID 47-3514247).

== Events ==
=== Advancing the platform ===
Important contributions to the Apple II have made their appearance at KansasFest. In 1996, a meeting between Richard Bennett of Australia, Ewen Wannop of Great Britain, and Geoff Weiss of the United States set the groundwork for the announcement at the 1997 meeting of the Marinetti control panel for the Apple IIGS. This system extension made possible TCP/IP connections to the Internet (something that Apple had never designed the computer to do). Also in 1997, some of the first Apple II web sites began to appear, and by the following year KansasFest had its own web site. In the next several years, it was common to see release of a CD-ROM collection of Apple II files of various kinds. In 2000, an Ethernet card called LANceGS for the Apple IIGS was demonstrated, and plans were made for a post-Delphi text-based contact point for Apple II users on the Internet, Syndicomm Online.

=== Recurring ===
Most years have one or more contests. These have included:

- HackFest - participants are given a focused period of time while at the event to create from scratch a program that does something cool.
- Tie One On - wear the most unusual or crazy tie at the banquet
- Door Decoration - being a college dorm, the doors can be decorated any interesting way desired
- Bite The Bag - a contest of agility in picking up a paper bag by biting it, with only one extremity touching the floor
- Games - Contestants attempt to achieve the highest score on classic Apple II games, such as GShisen or Lode Runner.
- Exhibits - demonstrating products or retro Apple II-related items

Another popular event held for many years was a "celebrity" roast of prominent members of the Apple II community.

== Dates and milestones ==
Event	Dates	Speaker	Keynote Title/Topic	Important Events
1st	Jul 21-22, 1989	Bill Mensch	Beyond The 65816	Called "A2-Central Summer Developer Conference"; formation of Apple II Developer Association
2nd	Jul 20-21, 1990	Fern Bachman, Jim Merritt, Jim Mensch, and Greg Branche from Apple	Apple IIGS System Software Update	Called "A2-Central Summer Conference"
3rd	Jul 16-21, 1991	Roger Wagner	"Why The Apple IIGS Is Such A Freakin' Great Machine"	First time it was referred to as "KansasFest". First broken bone (Randy Brandt attempting to stop Chuck Kelly playing basketball). Held at the NOMDA conference center, with housing and meals at Avila. System 6.0, HyperCard IIGS v1.1, Ethernet card, and SuperDrive card announced.
4th	Jul 21-26, 1992	Tim Swihart	State of the Apple Address	15th anniversary of Apple II. Sessions at NOMDA, housing at Avila. Resource Central takes over APDA (Apple Programmers and Developers Association) materials.
5th	Jul 22-24, 1993	Mike Westerfield	"Amateur Programming for Fun and Profit"	Apple II's "Sweet Sixteen" party. First year of "Bite the Bag" and Tie One On contest.
6th	Jul 21-23, 1994	Randy Brandt	"Confessions of a Primordial Programmer"	Called "ICONference"; held entirely at Avila.
7th	Jul 27-29, 1995	Roger Wagner	The Impact of Computers on Education / Personal History With The Apple II	First post-Resource Central event.
8th	Jul 17-21, 1996	Gary Utter	The Future Of The Apple II Community	Gary Utter's Declaration of Independence from Apple, Genie, and any other company, that it was time for Apple II users to take control of their own destiny. Demo of Gus Apple IIGS emulator, and Wolfenstein 3D for the IIGS
9th	Jul 30-Aug 3, 1997	David Kerwood	Apple II and Telecommunications	First demonstration of Richard Bennett's Marinetti TCP/IP CDev for the Apple IIGS. Early demo of Apple IIGS emulator Bernie ][ The Rescue.
10th	Jul 22-26, 1998	Mike Westerfield	Origins to ORCA	First Hackfest and first door sign contest, and Wolfenstein 3D Shootout.
11th	Jul 21-25, 1999	Max Jones	Past, Present, and Future of the Apple II	First release of Silvern Castle, and first visit to Sean Fahey's garage o' Apple II stuff.
12th	Jul 26-30, 2000	Ryan Suenaga	The Community and The Apple II	"Y ][ KFest". Conference streamed to Internet via webcam. Announcement of plans to create an online home for Apple II users on the Syndicomm and A2Central.com sites. LANceGS demo.
13th	Jul 25-29, 2001	Eric Shepherd	A Call To Arms To Support The Apple II Community	First demo of Syndicomm Online, the planned transfer of Juiced.GS to Syndicomm, and release of several CD-ROM collections.
14th	Jul 23-28, 2002	Tony Diaz	Tour of KFest Past	First KFest Kookout, first Krispy Kreme donut night. First demo of Rich Dreher's CFFA card.
15th	Jul 22-27, 2003	Steve Wozniak	Stories by Woz	Tiger Learning Computer demo, Jeri Ellsworth's "AnyCard".
16th	Jul 20-25, 2004	Steve Weyhrich	The Classic Car That Is The Apple II	Final year at Avila University.
17th	Jul 18-23, 2005	Ray Merlin	Mainframes And Micros	First year at Rockhurst University.
18th	Jul 17-22, 2006	Eric Shepherd	The Need To Re-energize The Apple II Community	Introduction of Sweet16 Apple IIGS emulator for Mac OS X, and of the Apple II podcast A2Unplugged.
19th	Jul 22-27, 2007	David Szetela	From Nibble To Apple	First demo of Michael Mahon's AppleCrate parallel processing machine.
20th	Jul 22-27, 2008	Lane Roathe	Programming Games For Fun And Profit	The return of AppleCrate, now with 17 motherboard processing power.
21st	Jul 21-26, 2009	Jason Scott	Preserving Our Digital Past	Included a video chat meeting with Apple II users in Wollongong, Australia, who were holding a parallel event, OzKFest.
22nd	Jul 20-25, 2010	Mark Simonsen	TimeOut For Beagle Bros	First presentation of "Apple ][ Forever" awards
23rd	Jul 19–24, 2011	Bob Bishop	Apple-Vision Of The Past	
24th	Jul 17–22, 2012	John Romero	The Apple II Was About Games	
25th	Jul 23–28, 2013	Randy Wigginton	"Genius, Creativity and Fun"	Apple co-founder Steve Wozniak made a surprise appearance, and stayed around to watch several of the sessions. Included a video chat meeting with Apple II users in Brisbane, Australia, who were holding a parallel event, OzKFest.
26th	Jul 22–27, 2014	Margot Comstock	Softalk	Included a video chat meeting with Apple II users in Paris, France.
27th	Jul 14–19, 2015	Rebecca Heineman	Games & the Apple II	Conference sessions streamed to Internet. Included a video chat meeting with Apple II users in Sydney, Australia.
28th	Jul 19–24, 2016	Mike Harvey	The Story of Nibble Magazine	
29th	Jul 18–23, 2017	Antoine Vignau & Olivier Zardini	Brutal Deluxe and The Apple II in France	
30th	Jul 16–22, 2018	Roger Wagner	Roger Wagner Keynote	Return of the Bite the Bag Contest
31st	Jul 15–21, 2019	Mark Pelczarski	Penguin Software: The Graphics People	
32st	Jul 24–25, 2020 (virtual-only)	No keynote		First virtual conference, due to COVID-19; 513 people registered; sessions streamed over Zoom with discussions on Discord
33st	Jul 23–24, 2021 (virtual-only)	No keynote		Second virtual conference; 470 people registered
34th	Jul 19–24, 2022 (hybrid attendance)	Robert Woodhead	50* Years of Doing Weird Things with Computers (*For slightly small values of 50.)	First hybrid conference with 43 on-site / 255 virtual attendees.
35th	Jul 18-23, 2023 (in-person) Jul 29-30, 2023 (virtual)	Wendell Sander Bob Consorti Dave Ottalini	Apple /// memories (Sander), On Three (Consorti), Washington Apple Pi /// SIG (Ottalini)	
36th	Jul 16–21, 2024 (in-person) Jul 27–28, 2024 (virtual)	Rich Williams Rob Gemmell Jordan Mechner		Held at University of Illinois Springfield, marking the first time in the event's history it's not been held in Kansas City, Missouri
37th	Jul 18–20, 2025 (virtual-only)	Dan Bricklin John Conrad		
38th	Jul 14-19, 2026 (in-person)	Jimmy Mench Dan Hillman Dan Kottke		Returning to University of Illinois Springfield. Theme for the event was celebrating the 40th anniversary of the Apple IIgs.

== Apple II Forever awards ==
Starting in 2010, the KansasFest Committee began to award members of the Apple II community who had made significant contributions to the Apple II, either in promoting or developing for the platform during its active years, or in helping to advance or preserve the Apple II since its production had been discontinued.

Year	Recipient	Contribution	Significance
2010	Mark Simonsen	Involved in Beagle Bros and founding of Software Touch	Helped take Beagle Bros out of the hobbyist arena and into productivity software, with TimeOut enhancements to AppleWorks and the upgrade to AppleWorks 3.0 in 1988.
2010	Tom Weishaar	Writer, programmer, publisher	Wrote software for Beagle Bros, an early slide display program called Frame-Up and a DOS speed up package called ProntoDOS. Took over the DOSTalk column in Softalk magazine after Bert Kersey concluded his run with it. After the fall of Softalk magazine, he started the very influential Open-Apple and A2-Central newsletters, as well as several disk-based publications for the Apple II under the name Resource Central. His work focused on the intermediate and advanced Apple II user. He helped enhance the management of the A2 and A2Pro Roundtables on the online service GEnie starting in 1988. Promoted developer interaction and synergy through the A2-Central Developer's Conference beginning in 1989. This event ultimately developed into KansasFest.
2010	Tom Vanderpool	Apple II user group leader, Resource Central	Open-Apple and A2-Central contributing author, helped with many aspects of Resource Central product sales.
2010	Dennis Doms	Writer, editor with Resource Central	Open-Apple and A2-Central contributing author, helped with many aspects of Resource Central efforts.
2010	Ellen Rosenberg	Editor with Resource Central	Editor at A2-Central, Managing editor at II Alive.
2010	Ken Gagne	Editor Juiced.GS, blogger, Open Apple podcast, former KansasFest public relations and committee member	Writer, blogger; editor of Juiced.GS magazine from 2006 until the present; co-founder of Open Apple podcast, and co-host from 2011 until March 2014; former KansasFest committee member and public relations director. Responsible for helping keep Apple II topics current and relevant.
2011	Bob Bishop	Programmer, Apple R&D co-founder	Wrote some of the first Apple II hi-res graphics games, released on cassette (ROCKET PILOT, STAR WARS, SAUCER INVASION, and SPACE MAZE), and the first Apple II program to generate human speech (APPLE-TALKER) and record speech (APPLE-LISTENER). Wrote software that controlled nine Apple II computers used in the game show Tic-Tac-Dough when it returned to television in 1978. Together with Steve Wozniak, he helped form the first research and development department at Apple Computer.
2011	Ryan Suenaga	Writer, programmer, KansasFest committee	Writer, contributing articles to many Apple II publications. Editor of GEnieLamp A2, The Lamp!, Juiced.GS from 2002 through 2006, and A2 News and Notes. Started one of the earliest Apple II podcasts, A2 Unplugged. Tireless promoter of KansasFest and related Apple II activities. Contributed several software programs to the Apple II community. He died in April 2011.
2011	Eric Shepherd	Programmer, writer, operator of Syndicomm Online, publisher	Programmer with multiple utilities to his credit, as well as some major efforts including the port of Wolfenstein 3D to the Apple IIGS, and the port of the Apple IIGS emulator Bernie ][ The Rescue to Mac OS X (renamed as Sweet16). Writer of articles about the Apple II. Was a major part of the creation of Syndicomm Online, which maintained a point of direct online access for Apple II computers during much of the first decade of the 21st century. Former owner of Syndicomm, which provided a source of hardware and software for the Apple II long after most other businesses had abandoned it. Through Syndicomm, published Juiced.GS magazine from 2002 through 2009.
2011	Tony Diaz	Expert on Apple II hardware, hardware hacker and collector, KansasFest Committee	Has the benefit of many years of experience in using, repairing, and hacking Apple II computers and peripherals, and is one of the most knowledgeable hardware people about the Apple II in the world today. Has also been an avid collector of anything and everything Apple II, including several prototypes for the platform produced at Apple during the Apple II era. Significant contributor to the KansasFest committee, with the benefit of attendance since the event started in 1989. He died in October 2021.
2011	Steven Weyhrich	Writer, author, blogger	Writer, blogger, author of the Apple II History (apple2history.org). Responsible for written preservation of details of the Apple II and its place in the history of Apple, Inc.
2012	John Romero	Programmer	Got his start playing and programming games on the Apple II, later moving on to the PC. With John Carmack he established the modern era of first-person shooter games, first with Wolfenstein 3D, then advancing the state of the art with Doom and then Quake.
2012	Randy Brandt	Programmer	Worked at Beagle Bros on products for AppleWorks, later was a major contributor to the project to update AppleWorks to version 3. Later spearheaded the project to further update it to AppleWorks 4 and later version 5. Wrote many TimeOut add-on programs for AppleWorks, both through Beagle Bros as well as his own company, JEM Software.
2012	Joe Kohn	Sysop, writer	Was chief sysop for the APPLESIG on The Source, later wrote articles for many different publications, and had a recurring monthly column ("Shareware Solutions") in inCider magazine. After the demise of inCider/A+, he started his own newsletter, Shareware Solutions II, and was heavily involved in the distribution of shareware titles to as many as he could help out. He was a connection point also for some of the talented French programmers who had made Apple IIGS games. Was a frequent presenter at KansasFest in its early to middle years. He died in January 2010.
2012	Ewen Wannop	Programmer, writer	Contributor and Chairman to several Apple User Groups in the UK, and was editor of the Apple II section of the British Apple Systems User Group / Apple2000 magazine, from 1981 through its disbanding in 1992. Ran the TABBS (The Apple Bulletin Board System) in the UK for many years, which serviced users in Europe and beyond. He is a self-taught programmer, with his first commercial program Data Highway released in Europe in 1984. He wrote many other utilities and programs since, the best known being the Apple IIGS telecommunications program Spectrum, first released in 1991. Since that time, most of his utilities have been clients for connection to the Internet, and some to simplify use of the Apple IIGS emulator Sweet16. Lecturer in photography, film, and animation for 24 years, then in desktop publishing for 10 years, up to his retirement in 1997.
2012	Geoff Weiss	Programmer, writer	Active programmer for the Apple IIGS, co-developer of Spectrum Internet Suite, the first GUI web browser for the IIGS, released in 1997. Instrumental in lighting the spark for Richard Bennett to develop the Marinetti TCP/IP stack. Contributor to the KEGS Apple IIGS emulator. Staff writer for the Juiced.GS magazine. Enhanced GS/OS functionality with the Hash Tool, Time Tool, and P8KeyChange. Wrote software for Apple IIGS maintenance including fixing corrupted Flash RAM Data on a LanceGS Ethernet Card and a memory card tester.
2012	Richard Bennett	Programmer, writer	Earliest commercial work was in 1983 writing utility packages and copy protections for Australian Apple II software publishers. Highlights include Oz DOS, the first patched DOS 3.3 for 3.5-inch drives, ProBOARD // and Eclipse BBS software, and The Complex multiplayer online game. With Seven Hills Software starting in 1990, he wrote the Express print spooler for the Apple IIGS; the Spectrum serial port, ANSI and PTSE drivers; version 2.0 of GraphicWriter III; and was involved with many other Seven Hills projects. He wrote the graphical front end for the IIGS for Genie in 1995, and in 1997 he brought the Apple IIGS onto the Internet with the Marinetti TCP/IP stack.
2013	Randy Wigginton	Programmer, developer	Apple employee #6, contributed to original development of RWTS, which was the foundation of Apple DOS for the Disk II. He was responsible for the adaptation of Microsoft's 6502 BASIC for use on the Apple II, creating the influential and long-lived Applesoft BASIC. He later wrote MacWrite for the original Macintosh.
2013	Steve Wozniak	Inventor, hardware designer, programmer	Co-founder of Apple Computer, Inc. Created the Apple-1, which was the start of the company. This developed into the Apple II platform, which was one of the longest-lived 8-bit computer platforms. He later created the Disk II, a low-cost adaptation of Shugart 5.25-inch [floppy disk] drive for the Apple II. Both products together propelled Apple into the Fortune 500, and funded the development of the Apple III, Apple Lisa, and Macintosh computers.
2013	Antoine Vignau	Programmer, Writer	Member of the French Apple IIGS programming group, Brutal Deluxe. He was originally part of the French software cracking group, Hackerforce. As part of Brutal Deluxe, has created numerous programs for both the 8-bit and 16-bit Apple II platforms, and even into the 2000s and 2010s has continued to be active. Also maintains an archive of names and WAV files of Apple II cassette software titles. Has been a writer for Juiced.GS magazine.
2013	Olivier Zardini	Programmer	Member of the French Apple IIGS programming group, Brutal Deluxe. As part of Brutal Deluxe, has created numerous programs for the Apple IIgs platform.
2013	Carl Knoblock	Member of Apple II community	Has been a serving member of the KansasFest community for many years, helping coordinate transportation to move attendees travelers to and from the Kansas City airport.
2013	Mike Maginnis	Blogger, podcaster, writer	Co-founder and co-host of the monthly Open Apple podcast and the weekly No Quarter podcast (about classic arcade games). Former staff writer for Juiced.GS, a quarterly Apple II magazine. Involved in scanning the full run of several Apple II and Apple III publications, including II Computing, Computist, AppleWorks Forum, Softalk, and ON THREE.
2014	Margot Comstock	Writer	Founder and staff writer for Softalk magazine.
2014	Al Tommervik	Writer	Founder and staff writer for Softalk magazine.
2014	Michael Mahon	Member of Apple II community, inventor, programmer	Creator of the AppleCrate parallel processing computer composed of multiple Apple II motherboards. Author of RT.SYNTH, a single-voice music synthesizer. Co-author of DMS Drummer, a percussion sequencer.
2014	Andrew Roughan	Member of Apple II community, writer, programmer	Apple II editor for Applecations, a monthly publication of the Apple Users Group, Sydney. Developer on the Marinetti Open Source Project. Staff writer for Juiced.GS. Convener of OzKfest, a gathering of Apple II enthusiasts in Australia.
2015	Rebecca Heineman	Programmer	Has created numerous programs for the Apple II and IIgs platforms including Tass Times in Tonetown, The Bard's Tale III: Thief of Fate, Dragon Wars and the IIgs ports of Battle Chess, and Another World.
2015	Henry Courbis	Hardware designer and vendor	Entrepreneur and owner of ReActiveMicro.com since 2005. Specializes in custom designs for 8bit and 16bit computers, primarily within the Apple II family. Responsible for Mockingboard v1, TransWarp GS Upgrades and the first to break the 10 MHz barrier with 18.75 MHz top end speed for most users, ROM1 Firmware Upgrade Adapter, Countless GAL and PLD upgrades released, Universal PSU Kit, IIgs 8Meg RAM Card, RAMworks IIII Kit, and RAMWorks and RAMFactor Expander clones. Active Apple II developer.
2015	Anthony Martino	Hardware designer and vendor	Hardware design on the Apple II Pi, an interface between the Apple II and a Raspberry Pi.
2015	Ivan Drucker	Programmer	Has created many utilities for the Apple II, including Applesoft utilities Slammer, Magic GOTO, and NuINPUT, as well as software to connect the Raspberry Pi to the Apple II, A2SERVER, A2CLOUD, and Raspple II.
2015	James Littlejohn	Hardware designer	Circuit board design and layout for the Apple II Pi board, an interface between the Apple II and a Raspberry Pi.
2015	David Schmenk	Programmer and hardware designer	Has created numerous original Apple II programs, including Escape from Home Brew Computer Club 3D, VM02 Java VM, and the PLASMA programming language. Inventor of the Apple II / Raspberry Pi interface.
2016	Mike Harvey	founder and editor of Nibble magazine	In 1980, Mike Harvey created Nibble, one of the first magazine with type-in programs for the Apple II computer. The publication ran from through January 1980 through July 1992, and during its later years also branched out into editions for PC and Macintosh computers.
2016	Jason Scott	archiver of software and magazines on Internet Archive	Has spearheaded efforts to preserve not only old Apple II software, but also the early days of dial-up bulletin board systems (textfiles.com) and software collections for all platforms that were sent out on disk and CD-ROMs in the 1990s and early 2000s.
2016	"4am"	archiving and preserving protected software	Responsible for modern-day deprotection of old commercial and educational software, allowing the programs to run on emulators and genuine Apple II hardware. The volume of his work has resulted in his own collection on the Internet Archive. He has also written Passport, a program that will automatically deprotect much old software.
2017	Plamen Vaysilov	hardware designer	Owner of A2Heaven, creator of many hardware items for the Apple II series, including RAM cards for the Apple IIc and Apple IIGS, VGA converters for all of the 8-bit models of the Apple II, and an SD card-based Disk II replacement.
2017	Glenn Jones	hardware designer	Creator of the Uthernet and Uthernet II cards, available at A2Retrosystems, which allowed many to get the Apple II online in the post-dial-up era.
2017	Quinn Dunki	hardware designer, programmer, podcaster, blogger	Known for her hardware design, which she documents on her blog, Blondihacks, firmware modifications to the Apple IIc Plus, and a member of the Open-Apple podcast.
2018	Roger Wagner	publisher, author, programmer	Known for articles and books, notably Assembly Lines as well as others; software publisher, notably HyperStudio
2018	John Brooks	programmer and hardware designer	Created the VidHD video interface; updated ProDOS
2018	John Keoni Morris	programmer, hardware designer, and archivist	Created AppleSauce, a revolutionary tool for preserving Apple II software including copy protection
2018	"Q. Kumba"	programmer and archivist	Assembly language guru leading efforts to preserve copy protected software; co-authored Total Replay
2019	Mark Pelczarski	author, programmer, entrepreneur	Wrote Graphics Magician software and the Graphically Speaking book; published and co-authored many popular software titles; computer graphics pioneer
2019	Kevin Savetz	archivist and podcast host	Hosts the ANTIC Podcast interviewing many historic computer folks; programmer
2019	Bill Martens	publisher, author, and archivist	Leads Call-A.P.P.L.E.; restored and published multiple books
2019	Brian Wiser	publisher, author, and archivist	Leads Call-A.P.P.L.E. and multiple Apple II archives; restored and published multiple books
2020	Gerard Putter	programmer	Created Virtual ][, an Apple II emulator for macOS.
2020	Tom Charlesworth	programmer	Development team for AppleWin, an Apple II emulator for Microsoft Windows.
2020	Nick Westgate	programmer	Development team for AppleWin, an Apple II emulator for Microsoft Windows.
2020	Michael Pohoreski	programmer	Development team for AppleWin, an Apple II emulator for Microsoft Windows.
2021	Megan Lemmert	game designer	Creator and Lead Designer for Nox Archaist, a computer role-playing game for the Apple II published by 6502 Workshop and released in 2020.
2022	Robert Woodhead	programmer, entrepreneur, engineer	Co-creator of the Wizardry series of computer role-playing games.
2022	Vince Briel	hardware engineer	Designer of the Replica 1, MP3 card, IIGS RAM card, and other hardware
2022	Melody Ayres-Griffiths	programmer	Designer and programmer of turtleSpaces
2022	April Ayres-Griffiths	programmer	Designer and programmer of turtleSpaces
2023	Bob Consorti	programmer, publisher, entrepreneur	Founder of On Three, which published On Three magazine and developed and sold hardware upgrades and software supporting Apple /// users long after the machine's discontinuation by Apple. Developer of BOS, a user group funded upgrade to Apple's last version of SOS. (This award was exceptionally named "Apple /// Forever")
2023	Martin Haye	programmer, organizer	Long-serving and hard-working member of the KansasFest organizing committee, developer of Super-Mon, a consistent presenter of creative and technically intriguing programming projects, and dedicated to fostering the Apple II community spirit
2023	Dave Ottalini	journalist, archivist	Longtime chair of the III Special Interest Group of Washington Apple Pi, dedicated to extending the productive life of the Apple /// platform for over a decade after the product line was canceled. Archiver and organizer of a large and widely distributed collection of public domain software for the Apple ///, and author of many articles reviewing developments in the Apple /// community and ecosystem. (This award was exceptionally named "Apple /// Forever")
2023	Wendell Sander	hardware engineer	Apple employee #16, and designer of the Apple ///, the Integrated Woz Machine (IWM) chip, and many of the early Apple II interface cards (including the Language Card). (This award was exceptionally named "Apple /// Forever")
2023	Niek van Suchtelen	hardware designer	Designer of the AppleSqueezer GS, a modern accelerator and RAM expansion device for the Apple IIGS
2024	Rich Williams	Apple alumnus (1979–2009)	Worked on the Apple IIc ROM code and was specifically responsible for the mouse and serial port firmware
2024	Rob Gemmell	Apple alumnus (1981–1989)	Apple industrial designer of computers and accessories, then Creative Director of packaging, tradeshows and events, corporate signage, and Apple’s identity
2024	Jordan Mechner	early Apple II game developer	Creator of Apple II games Karateka and Prince of Persia, which had stood the tests of time and have spawned countless sequels, spinoffs, remakes, journals, graphic novels, and documentaries
2024	Ian "Sark" Primus & Justin "DJ" Scott	hardware repair gurus	Operators of the KansasFest repair room, where they have brought countless attendees' hardware back to life
2024	Oliver Schmidt	software developer	For development and contributions to A2Pico, ca65, a2stream, and more
2025	Dan Bricklin	software developer	Co-creator of VisiCalc, the first electronic spreadsheet
2025	John Conrad	software developer	Developer of educational software published by Edu-Ware in the 1980s
2025	Jeff Mazur & Dean Claxton	hardware developers	Founders of JD Micro and creators of Apple II accessories and peripherals
2025	Sean Fahey	Community organizer	Longtime KansasFest committee president and co-organizer of the annual Garage Giveaway
2026	Jimmy Mensch	Apple engineer	Contributions to the development of the Apple IIgs and countless other Apple II and Macintosh products.
2026	Dan Hillman	Apple engineer	Apple IIgs design engineer. Co-designed the MEGAII chip (for Apple II backwards compatibility), part of the discontinued Apple IIx project and designer of the IEEE1394 standard.
2026	Dan Kottke	Apple engineer	The first paid full-time Apple employee. Hand assembled Apple I computers in the original garage. Personal friend of Steve Jobs. Long-time contributor to the Apple II project and community.
2026	Kate Szkotnicki	Community organizer	Longtime KansasFest committee member and organizer of INIT HELLO
