= List of publications and periodicals devoted to the Apple II =

The Apple II is an 8-bit home computer. It is one of the first highly successful mass-produced microcomputer products. Introduced in 1977, it was the first consumer product sold by Apple Computer and the first model in the series. Its success spurred a thriving magazine industry aimed at Apple II owners which published type-in programs, programming tutorials, reviews, and other articles.

== Magazines ==
- 8/16
- A+ (published by International Data Group)
- A2 Central On Disk
- Apple Assembly Lines
- A.U.G.E. (Apple User Group Europe)
- Call-A.P.P.L.E.
- Compute! Apple
- Computist
- Co-Op Spirit, published after A.P.P.L.E. ceased business operations in 1990, returning the group to User Group Status.
- GS+
- Hardcore Computist (later just Computist)
- II Alive (published by Quality Computers, a large mail-order retailer specializing in the Apple II)
- inCider (later merged with A+ and renamed "inCider/A+")
- Juiced.GS
- Nibble
- Open-Apple (later renamed "A2-Central"), published by Resource Central
- Pom's (France)
- Peelings II
- Reboot
- Softdisk and Softdisk G-S, by Softdisk Publishing
- SoftSide Apple Edition
- Shareware Solutions II
- The Apple II Review (later renamed "Apple IIGS Buyer's Guide")
- The Road Apple
- The Sorcerer's Apprentice
- Script-Central
- Softalk
- Studio City
- Windfall

Juiced.GS is still in print as of 2024, and is the only remaining print publication dedicated to the Apple II computer.

== User group newsletters ==
Most Apple user groups published newsletters; some of these gained fame outside their local area. The best known of these was the Call-A.P.P.L.E. (published by the Apple Pugetsound Program Library Exchange, A.P.P.L.E., in Seattle), the Washington Apple Pi Journal (published by Washington Apple Pi in Washington, D.C.). The Washington Apple Pi is still in operation and still publishing (though the focus is now on the Macintosh); A.P.P.L.E. ceased publication of Call-A.P.P.L.E. in 1990, printing the Co-Op Spirit for 3 years and restarting publication of Call-A.P.P.L.E. as an e-zine in 2002.
