= Apple II accelerators =

Hardware devices designed to speed up an Apple II computer

Apple II accelerators are computer hardware devices which enable an Apple II computer to operate faster than their intended clock rate.

== 8-bit accelerators ==
=== Number Nine Apple Booster – Number Nine Computer Corporation (Number Nine Visual Technology) ===
- Platform: Apple II, Apple II Plus
- Form Factor: 50-pin slot card
- Speed: 3.58 MHz
- Cache: 64 KB onboard RAM
- DMA compatible: No
- Upgradeable: No

Number Nine Apple Booster (1982) was one of the first accelerators for the Apple II series of computers. This card is the original version of Saturn's Accelerator II (thus the Accelerator II PCB shares both Saturn Systems' and NNCC's logos.) At $598, the Saturn was much cheaper than the NNCC, but little information about the board is available today.

=== SpeedDemon – Microcomputer Technologies (M-c-T) ===
- Platform: Apple II, Apple II Plus, Apple IIe
- Form Factor: 50-pin slot card
- Speed: 3.58 MHz
- Cache: 4 KB cache
- DMA compatible: No
- Upgradeable: No

Microcomputer Technologies (M-c-T) SpeedDemon card was the one of early Apple II accelerator which used the newer 65C02 microprocessor, and the first to implement caching technology. This allowed the card to use small amounts of memory, making the card less expensive to produce and eliminated the need to waste clock cycles in order to refresh the dynamic RAM that other cards used. Other accelerators which did not use caching operated at 3.58 MHz most of the time but had to slow down to 1 MHz for this refresh cycle. For peripheral cards that required 1 MHz "slow" operations, the Speed Demon always slowed access to slot #6 to 1 MHz, while an on-card jumper controlled the slot #4 and #5 slowdown. The SpeedDemon originally retailed for $295.

=== Accelerator II – Saturn Systems (Titan Technologies) ===
- Platform: Apple II, Apple II Plus
- Form Factor: 50-pin slot card
- Speed: 3.58 MHz
- Cache: 64 KB onboard RAM
- DMA compatible: No
- Upgradeable: No

Saturn System's Accelerator II was the original accelerator for the Apple II series of computers. The card accelerated the Apple II and the Apple II Plus using a faster MOS 6502 microprocessor and onboard high speed RAM. When the accelerator card was activated, software would execute within the CPU and memory on the card, not utilizing those components on the motherboard. The card used a series of 8 DIP switches to configure slot access speeds as well as the speed of the card. Since the Accelerator II was released before Apple's introduction of the Apple IIe, while the card would run in an Apple IIe, software which required a 65C02 microprocessor or used auxiliary memory would not function properly—this problem was solved with the Accelerator IIe, which was a complete redesign. Saturn Systems changed their name during the early 1980s to Titan Technologies due to trademark complications.

=== Accelerator IIe – Titan Technologies (formerly Saturn Systems) ===
- Platform: Apple II, Apple II Plus
- Form Factor: 50-pin slot card
- Speed: 3.58 MHz
- Cache: 64 KB onboard RAM + 16 KB shadow ROM
- DMA compatible: No
- Upgradeable: No

The Accelerator //e was released in 1984 by Titan Technologies, an upgraded version of the original Saturn Accelerator, in response to the introduction of the Apple IIe. The card maintained the 64 KB of RAM of the original card and added the newer 65C02 microprocessor. This card solved the Auxiliary RAM incompatibility problem of the older card, however it did not speed up this second bank of RAM which was common on the Apple IIe.

=== TransWarp – Applied Engineering ===
- Platform: Apple II, Apple II Plus, Apple IIe
- Form Factor: 50-pin slot card
- Speed: 3.58 MHz
- Cache: 256 KB onboard RAM
- DMA compatible: No
- Upgradeable: No

Applied Engineering was the last company to offer a slot-based Apple II accelerator card, the TransWarp. This new card offered complete slot configurability via DIP switches and speed control via both DIP switches and software. A user could hold down the Esc key upon bootup, to disable the card for speed sensitive applications. In an Apple II Plus, the TransWarp emulated the 16k language card. The TransWarp ran at the same 3.58, 1.79 and 1.02 (commonly listed as "1") MHz speeds as other accelerators of its time, however, it included a whopping 256 KB of onboard RAM. According to the March 1986 Apple Assembly Line (volume 6, number 6) this is how the TransWarp utilized the RAM:

TransWarp's 256K RAM is effectively divided into four 64K banks. When you power-up your Apple with TransWarp installed, all of the ROM from $D000 through $FFFF is copied into one of the high-speed RAM banks. The rest of this bank is not used. A second bank is used in place of the motherboard RAM. The third and fourth banks are used in place of the first and second banks of AUXMEM, if you have a RAM card such as RAMWORKS installed in the AUX slot. If you have a large RAMWORKS in the auxiliary slot of a //e, any additional banks beyond two will still be usable but at "only" 1 MHz.

The same issue of the publication determined that the TransWarp was faster than either the McT SpeedDemon or Titan Accelerator //e when running the same applications, even though all three cards ran at the same 3.58 MHz native speed. The TransWarp was released during the early-mid 1980s with an original retail price of $279. Applied Engineering offered a unique $89 upgrade to the 16-bit 65802 microprocessor, for people who were able to use its advanced features.

=== TransWarp II – Applied Engineering (AE) ===
- Platform: Apple IIe
- Form Factor: 50-pin slot card
- Speed: 3.58 MHz or 7.16 MHz
- Cache: Unknown
- DMA compatible: No
- Upgradeable: No

The TransWarp II was a completely redesigned accelerator from Applied Engineering (AE). The company scrapped the onboard RAM design of the original TransWarp in favor of a licensed cache based implementation like Zip Technology used. However, instead of using a hybrid chip, Applied Engineering chose to implement the design on a card. Unfortunately, since the design was licensed from Bits and Pieces, makers of the Rocket Chip, and not from Zip Technologies, Applied Engineering was forced to stop selling the TransWarp II not long after its introduction, due to Zip winning a patent infringement lawsuit against Bits and Pieces for Zip's implementation of caching technology.

=== TransWarp III (never released) – Applied Engineering ===
- Platform: Apple IIe
- Form Factor: 50-pin slot card
- Speed: 8 MHz+
- Cache: Unknown
- DMA compatible: Yes
- Upgradeable: Yes

Applied Engineering's TransWarp III was supposed to be the TransWarp II's replacement after that product's abrupt discontinuation. Because of a dwindling Apple II market in the early 1990s, the TransWarp III never saw the light of day. Some believe that images in advertisements announcing the TransWarp III in Apple II related magazines were complete mock-ups and that the product never existed. The ads touted faster speeds and easy upgradeability when faster 65c02 microprocessors became available.

=== Zip Chip – Zip Technologies ===
- Platform: Apple IIe, Apple IIc
- Form Factor: CPU replacement chip
- Speed: 4 MHz, 8 MHz
- Cache: 8 KB
- DMA compatible: Yes
- Upgradeable: No

Zip Technologies introduced the 4 MHz Zip Chip Model 4000 (also: Zip Chip II - 4) at AppleFest in May 1989. This was a revolutionary design. Rather than building an accelerator on an expansion card, Zip used a hybrid chip design known as System in Package (SiP), and used this chip module to directly replace the microprocessor in the Apple II. They took a 65C02 core and combined it with control logic and 8 KB of cache RAM into a very compact 40-pin DIP package, not much bigger than the original 65C02 CPU it replaced. By creating this ultra-compact, slotless accelerator, the entire untapped market of tens of thousands of Apple IIc computers with otherwise limited expansion options became available. Within the Zip Chip, all settings were software controllable, including individual slot speeds which could be set at 1 MHz or "accelerated." The accelerator was a cache type, based on Zip Technology's US patent #4,794,523 and was capable of 10 different speed settings. Zip later introduced a Zip Chip Model 8000 (also: Zip Chip II - 8) which had identical features but operated at 8 MHz.

=== Zip GSX – Zip Technologies ===
- Platform: Apple IIGS
- Form Factor: 50-pin slot card
- Speed: 7—15 MHz
- Cache: 16, 32, or 64 KB (8, 16, or 32 KB data, 8, 16, or 32 KB tag)
- DMA compatible: Yes
- Upgradeable: Yes

The accelerator consists of the CPU WDC 65C816 running at most at 15 MHz. A cache divided into 32 KB "data" and 32 KB "tag". The result is an average 4x performance boost.

Two less expensive models were advertised but never released: model 1500 "ZipChipGS" and model 1525 "ZipChipGS Plus". These two models were designed to fit into the CPU socket (similar to the 8-bit ZipChip models) rather than taking up a slot. The less expensive model 1500 would have omitted DMA support and was supposed to run at 8 MHz with 8 KB of cache. The 1525 would also have run at 8 MHz but it would have included DMA support and 16 KB of cache.

The slot-based model 1600 ("Zip GSX") was made available at several different clock speeds and with varying amounts of cache. Both the cache and CPU speed were upgradeable.

=== Rocket Chip – Bits and Pieces ===
- Platform: Apple II, Apple II Plus, Apple IIe
- Form Factor: CPU replacement chip
- Speed: 5 MHz, 10 MHz
- Cache: Unknown
- DMA compatible: No
- Upgradeable: No

Bits and Pieces introduced the Rocket Chip soon after the Zip Chip was released. The product was nearly identical in look and function to Zip Technology's Zip Chip, however it operated at 5 MHz vs the Zip Chip Model 4000's 4 MHz, and the Rocket Chip II ran at a then blistering 10 MHz when it was released after the 8 MHz Zip Chip Model 8000. One unique feature of the Rocket Chip was its ability to slow the speed of an Apple II down to 0.05 MHz for "slow motion" operability. Although the Rocket Chip was faster in both instances than the Zip Chip, there were some rare software incompatibilities with the chip, while the Zip Chip didn't have any reported problems. These problems were perhaps due to Bits and Pieces pushing the physical limit of their 65C02 cores to squeeze out the extra speed in a game of one-upmanship with Zip Technologies. Zip Technologies ended up with the upper hand when they successfully sued Bits and Pieces for patent infringement and in turn forced the company out of business.

=== A2 Turbo – Ian Kim ===
- Platform: Apple II, Apple II Plus, Apple IIe
- Form Factor: 50-pin slot card
- Speed: 3.58 MHz, 7.16 MHz
- Cache: 256 KB
- DMA compatible: No
- Upgradeable: No

Developed by Ian Kim. May 2021

=== A2 OverDrive – Ian Kim ===
- Platform: Apple II, Apple II Plus, Apple IIe
- Form Factor: 50-pin slot card
- Speed: 3.58 MHz, 7.16 MHz, 16 MHz
- Cache: 512 KB
- DMA compatible: No
- Upgradeable: No

Developed by Ian Kim. May 2021. There are 2 8-bit digital output ports and 1 8-bit input port. There is also a 16-bit interrupt generator (IRQ or NMI). With this function, it can play WAV songs in 22 kHz Stereo. In addition, 64 KB compatible with Saturn and 384 KB compatible with RAMWORK are built-in. There is additional RAM in the SLOT ROM address, which is a special function, and it can be usefully used when developing programs.

=== Apple IIc Plus motherboard ===
- Platform: Apple IIc Plus
- Form Factor: Motherboard built-in
- Speed: 8 - 10+ MHz
- Cache: 8 KB
- DMA compatible: N/A
- Upgradeable: Yes

Apple Computer licensed the cache based accelerator design from Zip Technologies for their design of the Apple IIc Plus. This enabled the computer to run 4 times faster than its 1 MHz predecessor, the Apple IIc. Rather than using a monolithic System in Package design of the Zip Chip, which may have caused overhead clearance problems as well as added cost to the compact Apple IIc Plus, Apple economically separated the Zip Chip design into its individual components, using off the shelf static RAM chips for the 8 KB cache.

==== Overclocking ====
In October 2001, Michael J. Mahon, an enthusiast who frequents the Apple II usenet newsgroup comp.sys.apple2, proposed overclocking the Apple IIc Plus. Over the next few years, newsgroup members reported speeds ranging between 8 MHz - 10 MHz simply by changing the 16 MHz crystal oscillator on the motherboard to a faster one (the Apple IIc Plus divides the oscillator frequency by four to attain the actual processor frequency). Some users with 120 ns static RAM cache reported problems attaining 10 MHz while others with 100 ns chips were more successful. Most were able to achieve 8 MHz.

== See also ==
- Apple II peripheral cards
