= Donald's Alphabet Chase =

1988 educational video game

- Developer: Westwood Associates
- Publisher: Walt Disney Computer Software
- Producer: Darlene Waddington
- Designers: Darlene Waddington; Brett Sperry
- Artists: Paul Johnson; Maurine Starkey
- Composers: Mike Clarke; Dave Kelly
- Platforms: Apple II, Commodore 64, Amiga, Amstrad CPC, MS-DOS, ZX Spectrum
- Release: 1988: Apple II, MS-DOS; 1990: C64; 1991: CPC, Spectrum
- Genre: Educational
- Mode: Single-player

Donald's Alphabet Chase is an educational video game developed by Westwood Associates and published in 1988 by Walt Disney Computer Software. It was released on various home computers including the Amiga, Amstrad CPC, Apple II, Commodore 64, MS-DOS and ZX Spectrum. An Atari ST version was planned by Nathan Software but got no release. The game was released in five different languages including English, Spanish, French, Italian and German.

== Plot ==
The Alphabet pets have escaped from the toybox in Huey, Dewey, and Louie's bedroom and are roaming around Donald's house. It is up to Donald to catch them and bring them all together.

== Gameplay ==
The player helps Donald to catch runaway letters. The gameplay is pretty straightforward. In each room of his house, Donald will chase three, four or five letters. The player is required to press a letter on the keyboard which corresponds to the letter that Donald is trying to catch.

== Educational goals ==
The game was designed on a low budget with the ability to teach literacy at a basic level, letter recognition and simple keyboard typing skills as well as reinforcing knowledge on uppercase letters and thus teaching them how to match letters of the alphabet with the letters on the keyboard. The structure of the letters divided into five rooms allows children to understand and learns different letter groups. Children can freely explore the game, while parents can guide them depending on their abilities.

== Reception ==
Reception

Review scores
Publication	Score
Computist	3/5 (Apple II)
Amiga Format	4/5 (Amiga)

A Computist reviewer gave the Apple II version 3 out of 5 stars, praising the game's animation and decent sound, but deeming it lacking in challenge. Amiga Format gave the Amiga version 4 out of 5 stars, finding the animations hilarious to watch, but finding the use of uppercase letter limiting in teaching material.

The game along with Mickey's Runaway Zoo and Goofy's Railway Express sold around 400,000 copies in a year of their development. The Amiga version was showcased at the 1990 Summer Consumer Electronics Show. By April 1991, the Amiga version became one of the top 10 selling products in the UK. By October 1991, the game was showcased at the annual Windhoek Show as part of Schoemans Office Systems. Of the 25 computer Disney Software games around 1993, Donald's Alphabet Chase was among the most successful.

== See also ==
- List of Disney video games
