= Hyperactive (disambiguation) =

Hyperactive describes someone or something exhibiting hyperactivity.

Hyperactive may also refer to:

- "Hyperactive!", a song by Thomas Dolby from The Flat Earth
- "Hyperactive" (Robert Palmer song), 1985
- "Hyperactive", a song by Raven from The Pack Is Back
- "Hyperactive", a song by Kill Hannah from American Jet Set
- "Hyperactive", a song by GMS from No Rules
- "Hyperactive", a song by The Donnas from Get Skintight
- HyperActive, a multimedia arts publication published by Resource Central
- "Hyperactive", a YouTube video by Lasse Gjertsen
- Hyperactivity, or locomotor hyperactivity, a behavioral effect in animals
