= Val Golding =

American magazine editor (1930–2008)

Val J. Golding (1930–2 July 2008) was an American magazine editor. He founded Apple Pugetsound Program Library Exchange (A.P.P.L.E) in February 1978 with fellow Apple II enthusiasts Mike Thyng and Bob Huelsdonk at the behest of Max Cook, the local ComputerLand store manager. The first meeting of the group had 15 people, and within a year, the group had grown to a couple thousand Apple computer fans. In 1984, he left the group and went to Shreveport, Louisiana to work for another Apple-related magazine.

Golding started Call-A.P.P.L.E. magazine and published All About Applesoft, All About DOS, and All About Pascal.

Golding also published several software packages over that time and took A.P.P.L.E from the beginning well into the phase where the group became a global operation specializing in software for all levels of users.

In 2002, Golding returned to the group as a chairman of the board of A.P.P.L.E. He was also known for his historical documents related to the San Francisco street cars as well as his musical endeavors. Golding died after a long bout with cancer on 2 July 2008, at age 77.
