= Apple Assembly Line =

Apple Assembly Line was a monthly newsletter edited by Bob Sander-Cederlof from October 1980 through May 1988. The publisher was S-C Software Corporation based in Dallas, Texas.

== Overview ==
The newsletter focused on assembly language programming for the Apple II personal computer. Initially, the programs were only written for the MOS 6502 microprocessor, but this expanded to the 65C02, 65802, and 65816 microprocessors as the Apple II family continued to develop.

Sander-Cederlof used the S-C Macro Assembler, which he had authored and sold himself, to publish his programs. At its peak, the newsletter had over 1000 subscribers–mainly those learning to program in assembly language–with issues being mailed all over the world.

== Reception ==
In a retrospective of Apple II periodicals, Steven Weyhrich wrote:

This was something more than a newsletter, but not quite a magazine. It was edited and printed by Bob Sander-Cederlof, author of the S-C Macro Assembler, and was written initially for support of that product. It included information about how to write assembly language routines for various projects, and one of Sander-Cederlof’s favorite pastimes was finding ways to squeeze the most code into the fewest bytes possible. Often he would take sections of code from Apple’s system software, disassemble it, and point out how it could have been coded more tightly or efficiently. He also included various products that he or others had written that were useful for other programmers, including a package of extensions for Applesoft BASIC that allowed 18-digit-precision math functions.

== See also ==
- Apple Performa Plus Display
- List of publications and periodicals devoted to the Apple II
