= ORCA/Modula-2 =

- Original author(s): Peter Easdown
- Developer(s): The Byte Works
- Initial release: about 1994; 31 years ago
- Written in: Modula-2
- Platform: Apple IIGS
- Type: compiler

ORCA/Modula-2 is a Modula-2 compiler written in the Modula-2 programming language for the Apple IIGS computer.

It was developed by Peter Easdown during 1993–94 and published by The Byte Works. Whilst originally developed separately, when it was finally published, it was fully integrated with the development platform/environment called the Apple Programmers Workshop or ORCA/M.

The compiler was originally developed using a version of TopSpeed Modula-2 on an Intel 80286 based PC. The output of the compiler at this point was 65816 assembler source for assembly by ORCA/M on the Apple IIGS. Once the compiler was stable enough, the IBM PC was decommissioned, and all development was done on the Apple IIGS.

At publication, the compiler was shipped with comprehensive support for the Apple IIGS's operating system (GS/OS) and toolkit.

Due to the demise of the Apple IIGS, ORCA/Modula-2 never had much impact on the market.

The compiler development continued however for a short while during 1995, after which it stalled.

The source code for the compiler can now be found on GitHub.
