= The Byte Works =

- Industry: Software
- Founder: Mike Westerfield
- Website: www.byteworks.us

The Byte Works, founded and run by Mike Westerfield, was a key player in the history of developer tools for Apple II computers. Its first product, the ORCA/M assembler (Object Relocatable Code Assembler for Microcomputers, and also MACRO spelled backwards), developed jointly by Westerfield and Phil Montoya, was a powerful assembly language development environment, complete with a Unix-style shell, which ran on 8-bit Apple II computers.

However, The Byte Works came into its own when Apple Computer was developing the Apple IIGS computer. In need of developer tools, they contacted The Byte Works and came to an agreement by which The Byte Works would develop the official developer tool suite for the Apple IIgs -- the Apple Programmer's Workshop (APW). This tool suite eventually would include an assembler as well as a C compiler.

The Byte Works was also able to distribute its own developer tool suite, based on the same code as APW. The ORCA/M assembler came first, followed by ORCA/Pascal, ORCA/C, and several other languages, including ORCA/Modula-2 and ORCA/Integer BASIC.

The Byte Works did produce software other than developer tools, although tools were their mainstay. The Quick Click Calc spreadsheet was an excellent spreadsheet for the Apple IIgs, although it arrived on the scene too late to have any major impact on the market.

An easy-to-use and very powerful BASIC interpreter called GSoft BASIC was also eventually released in the mid-1990s. With the ability to communicate with the Apple IIgs Toolbox, it could be used to produce powerful software with a minimum of effort.

The Byte Works ceased development of Apple II software in 2000 and licensed its entire product line to Syndicomm, which continues to publish its extensive library to this day. In 2015, this license was extended to Juiced.GS.
