= Nox Archaist =

2020 video game

- Developer: 6502 Workshop
- Publisher: 6502 Workshop
- Programmer: Megan Lemmert
- Platforms: Apple II, macOS, Windows
- Release: 2020
- Genre: Role-playing video game
- Mode: Single-player

Nox Archaist is a role-playing video game released in December 2020 for the then-historical platform Apple II, alongside contemporary macOS and Windows systems. The game was inspired by the early-to-mid Ultima games and The Bard's Tale. The story unfolds in a sword and sorcery setting of a world named Vali: Sent to an island region to investigate a cult, the player character finds companions and undertakes excursions across diverse terrain, encountering NPCs, monsters, and magical hazards along the way. A DLC named Lord of Storms was released in 2023.

Beginning in 2015, development was conducted by 6502 Workshop, a retrocomputing group headed by programmer Megan Lemmert. Programming was done in the assembly language of MOS Technology 6502, the original Apple II processor. The 8-bit game engine is tile-based and uses the HGR mode (280 × 192 pixels). The RAM requirement for the Apple II release is 128k.

Following the announcement of the project in 2016, a technical presentation was held at the 2017 edition of KansasFest, an annual event for Apple II enthusiasts. A Kickstarter campaign was launched later in the same year but failed to reach the funding target. A second Kickstarter campaign to publish the game ran successfully in 2019.

Apple II lead designer Steve Wozniak makes a cameo as a non-player character. Richard Garriott, creator of the Ultima series, appears as Lord British, his in-game personification from that series.

Lemmert won the 2021 KansasFest Apple II Forever Award for her work on the game.
