= Apple Pugetsound Program Library Exchange =

Apple users' group

The Apple Pugetsound Program Library Exchange (A.P.P.L.E.) is a users' group established in 1978 by Val Golding.

== History ==
The group provided software, hardware and support services for the Apple world until 1990. Val Golding left the group in 1984 and the group became a Co-Operative in 1985.

From 1990 to 2001, the group existed as a user's group only providing support to local Northwest computer users. In 2001, Bill Martens began to look into the possibility of preserving the information associated with the company and in contacting many of the former writers, board members and staff, found that there was an interest in preserving and rebuilding the company. In February 2002, this effort began with the production of Call-A.P.P.L.E. Magazine being restored.

== Purpose ==
A.P.P.L.E. is an all-volunteer Apple / Macintosh users group with no paid staff. Much of the group is currently based in the Seattle area, production is now handled in Japan and Canada. The group provides information, software, hardware, documentation, and support for all Apple computers.

A.P.P.L.E. is one of the oldest official Apple Users Groups and specializes in providing users with usable freeware and shareware. They also publish their magazine, Call-A.P.P.L.E., on a monthly basis in addition to online libraries.

== Publications ==
A.P.P.L.E. has published numerous books over the years, most related to modifying or programming the Apple II and Apple /// series of computers. The first book published by the group was from the personal notes of Steve Wozniak and Randy Wigginton. The 300 plus pages were photocopied and the "Wozpak" was produced complete with program tape. The book was later typeset and reproduced as the "Wozpak][" with floppy disk.

Other books included the "Call-A.P.P.L.E. In Depth" series and the "Call-A.P.P.L.E. Compendium" series which were primarily related to the source code listings from the magazines. Most of these books included floppies classified in the Anthology series. The Anthology disks were mostly Applesoft and Integer basic programs from the monthly issues of Call-A.P.P.L.E. magazine. The 1981 Pascal anthology was produced by current A.P.P.L.E. president Bill Martens. Most of these books and software are still available today in CD or DVD format.

A.P.P.L.E. has produced 19 volumes of Call-A.P.P.L.E. magazine from 1978 to 1990 and 2002 to 2007. The magazine is produced on a monthly basis and contains information about all aspects of Apple computers from Apple-1 to the latest Macintosh computers with Mac OS X.

A.P.P.L.E. has also produced other publications over the years including /// Cheers! (1984–1985), 32 Little Apples (1984–1986), Mac A.P.P.L.E. (1986–1988), Mac Horizons (1988–1989), The APDA Log (1984–1989), The Mac Tech Quarterly (1989–1990) and the Co-Op Spirit (1991–1994).

== Presidents ==
- Founder: Val J. Golding
- 1978–1994: Richard J. Hubert
- 1994–2001: Norman Dodge
- 2006–2006: Mike Pfaiffer
- 2007–2008: Bill Martens
- 2008–2009: Mike Pfaiffer
- 2010-Present: Bill Martens

== See also ==
- Apple User Group Connection
