= Apple IIc =

Fourth model Apple II computer model

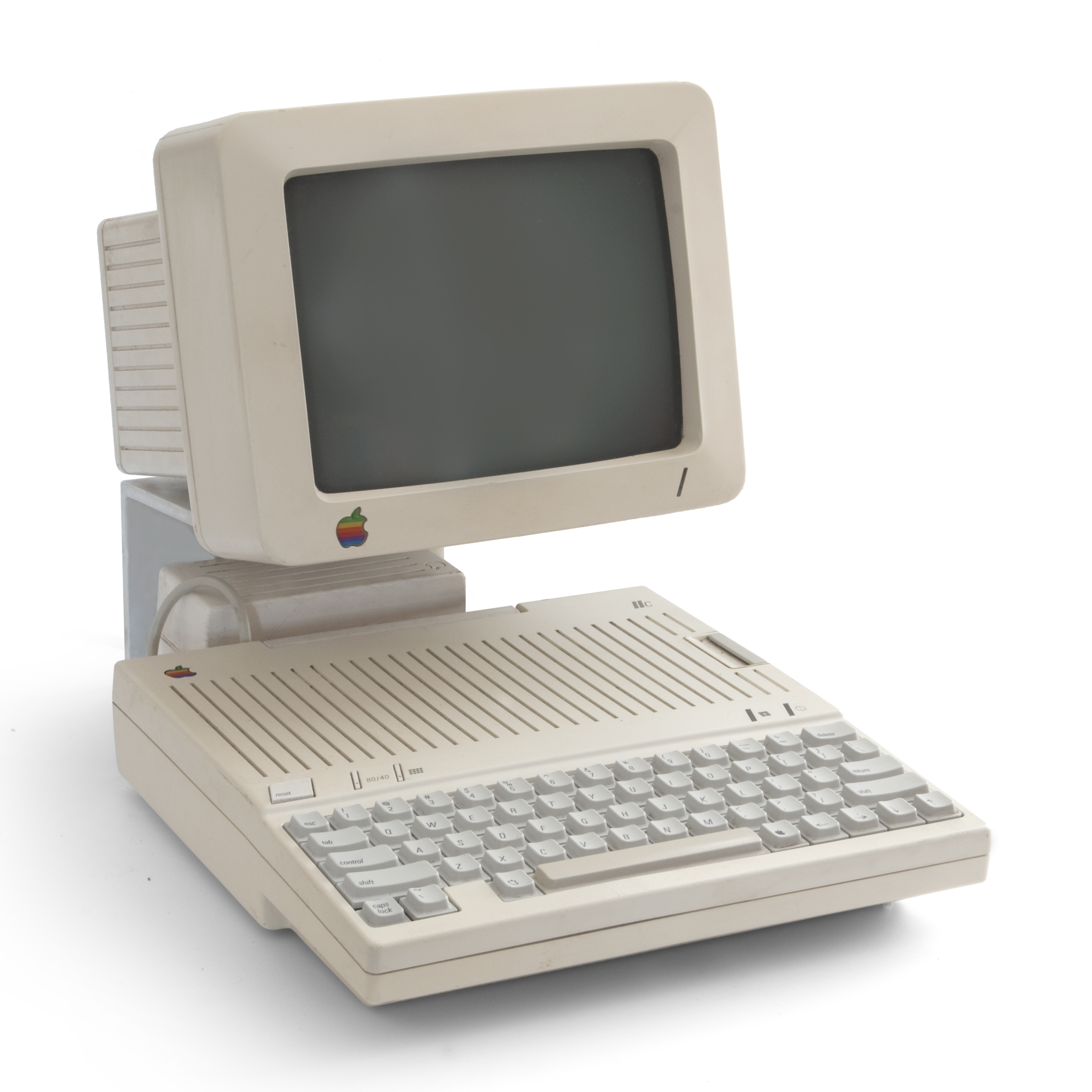
- Apple IIc with matching monitor
- Developer: Apple Computer, Inc.
- Released: April 24, 1984; 42 years ago
- Introductory price: US$1,295 (equivalent to $4,010 in 2025)
- Discontinued: August 1988
- Units sold: 380,000 – 420,000
- Units shipped: 385,000 – 430,000
- Operating system: Apple ProDOS; Apple DOS 3.3; Apple Pascal
- CPU: WDC 65C02 @ 1.023 MHz
- Memory: 128 KB, upgradable to 1.125 MB
- Removable storage: 5 1/4-inch 140 KB Disk II floppy disk
- Controller input: Joystick/mouse port
- Connectivity: Two RS-232 ports
- Weight: 7.5 lb (3.4 kg)
- Successor: Apple IIc Plus
- Related: Apple IIe, Apple IIGS

The Apple IIc is the fourth model in the Apple II series of personal computers produced by Apple Computer. Released in April 1984, it was designed as a portable version of the Apple IIe, integrating a keyboard and a 5 1/4-inch floppy disk drive into a compact housing with a built-in carrying handle. It weighs about 7.5 pounds (3.4 kg). Apple also offered a matching monitor. The c in the name stands for compact. The IIc is compatible with a wide range of Apple II software and peripherals.

The Apple IIc has rear peripheral expansion ports integrated onto the main logic board instead of the expansion slots and direct motherboard access of earlier Apple II models. Apple intended the Apple IIc to require less technical expertise to use. It was succeeded by the Apple IIc Plus in 1988.

== History ==
The Apple IIc was released on April 24, 1984, during an Apple-held event called Apple II Forever. With that motto, Apple proclaimed the new machine was proof of the company's long-term commitment to the Apple II and its users, despite the recent introduction of the Macintosh. The IIc was also seen as the company's response to the new IBM PCjr, and Apple hoped to sell 400,000 by the end of 1984. The company described it as a portable computer despite lacking a display or battery. While essentially an Apple IIe computer in a smaller case, it was not a successor, but rather a complement. One Apple II machine would be sold for users who required the expandability of slots, and another for those wanting the simplicity of a plug and play machine with portability in mind.

The machine introduced Apple's Snow White design language, notable for its case styling and a modern look designed by Hartmut Esslinger which became the standard for Apple equipment and computers for nearly a decade. The Apple IIc introduced a unique off-white coloring known as "Fog", chosen to enhance the Snow White design style. The IIc and some peripherals are the only Apple products to use the "Fog" coloring.

Codenames for the machine while under development included Lollie, ET, Yoda, Teddy, VLC, IIb, IIp.

== Overview of features ==
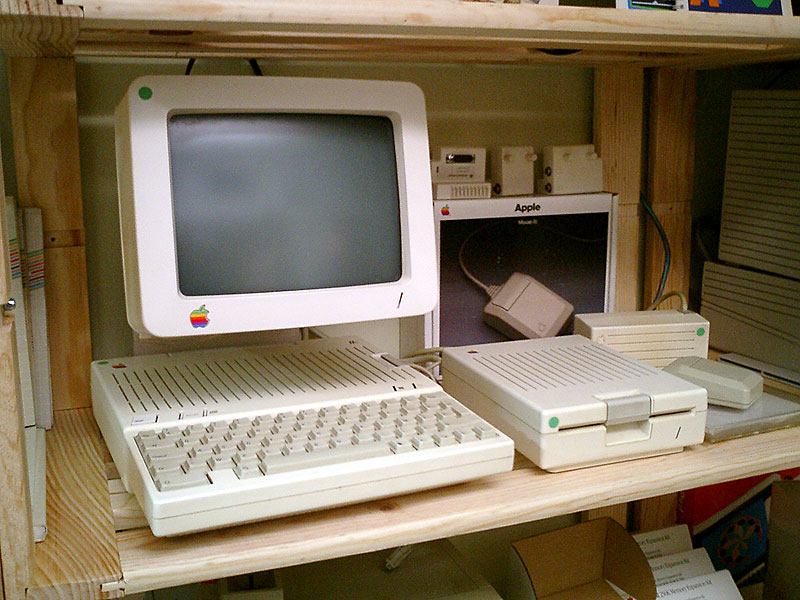
Apple IIc including monitor, external floppy drive and mouse

=== Improving the IIe ===
The Apple IIc is an Apple IIe in a smaller case, more portable and easier to use but also less expandable. The IIc uses the CMOS-based 65C02 microprocessor which added 27 new instructions to the 6502, but is incompatible with programs that use illegal opcodes of the 6502. (Apple stated that the Apple IIc was compatible with 90–95% of the 10,000 software packages available for the Apple II.) The new ROM firmware allows Applesoft BASIC to recognize lowercase characters and work better with an 80-column display, and fixes several bugs from the IIe ROM. In terms of video, the text display adds 32 unique character symbols called "MouseText" which, when placed side by side, can display simple icons, windows and menus to create a graphical user interface completely out of text, similar in concept to IBM code page 437 or PETSCII's box-drawing characters. A year later, the Apple IIe would benefit from these improvements in the form of a four-chip upgrade called the Enhanced IIe.

=== Built-in cards and ports ===
The equivalent of five expansion cards are built-in and integrated into the Apple IIc motherboard: An Extended 80-Column Text Card, two Super Serial Cards, a Mouse Card, and a Disk II floppy drive controller card. The Apple IIc has 128 KB RAM, 80-column text, and Double-Hi-Resolution graphics built-in and available right out of the box, unlike the IIe. The built-in cards are mapped to virtual slots so software from the slot-based Apple II can use them without modification. The entire Apple Disk II Card, used for controlling floppy drives, is part of the single chip called the "IWM" (Integrated Woz Machine).

In the rear of the machine are connection ports. The standard DE-9 joystick connector doubles as a mouse interface, compatible with the same mice used by the Lisa and early Macintoshes. Two serial ports are primarily for a printer and modem, and a floppy port connector supports a single external 5.25-inch drive (and later "intelligent" devices such as 3.5-inch drives and hard disks). A Video Expansion port provides rudimentary signals for add-on adapters but, alone, cannot directly generate a video signal (Apple produced an LCD and an RF-modulator for this port; the latter shipped with early IIc computers). A port connector ties into an internal 12 V power converter for attaching batteries; this is where the large external power supply (dubbed "brick on a leash" by users) plugs in. The same composite video port found on earlier Apple II models is present, but not the cassette ports or internal DIP-16 game port.

=== Built-in accessories and keyboard ===
The Apple IIc has a built-in 5.25-inch floppy drive (140 KB) along the right side of the case, the first Apple II model to include such a feature. Along the left side of the case is a dial to control the volume of the internal speaker, along with a 1/8-inch monaural audio jack for headphones or an external speaker.

A fold-out carrying handle is also used to prop up the back end of the machine when in use. This is required to provide good air circulation and make typing comfortable. The photos in this article show the system sitting flat, which was not uncommon for owners to do as it allowed accessories to be stacked on the upper surface.

The keyboard layout is similar to that of the Apple IIe; however, the "Reset" key is above the "Esc" key. Two toggle switches are also located in the same area: an "80/40"-column switch for (specially written) software to detect which text video mode to start up in, and a "Keyboard" switch to select between QWERTY and Dvorak layout, or between US and national layout on non-American machines. The keyboard itself is built into the front half of the case, much like a notebook computer, and early models have a rubber mat placed beneath the keycaps which acted as a liquid spill guard.

== Reception ==
Apple expected the IIc to be its top seller during Christmas 1984, competing against the improved PCjr. The company almost stopped production of the IIe because of the IIc's expected popularity, causing a shortage of the former and glut of the latter. By April 1985, rumors said that Apple had 100,000 more IIe orders than inventory, and 100,000 more IIc units than orders, resulting in IIc discounts.

Although Apple predicted that it would sell 100,000 IIc computers per month, it sold an average of 100,000 per year over four years; even the unsuccessful PCjr outsold it during each computer's first year on the market. Although the IIc was less expensive than the IIe in most configurations, the latter was much more popular than the former because of greater expandability, with the newer computer not outselling the older until late 1984. (However, according to Paul Kunkel in AppleDesign, Apple sold more than 400,000 Apple IIc computers in the first year, most of the sales including the matching monitor.)

IIc's incomplete compatibility—mostly because of copy protection—also affected sales; while not as serious a problem as PCjr's imperfect PC compatibility, Apple's internal guide to affected products grew from April 1984's 47 pages to July 1984's 93. As publishers rewrote software some appeared in separate IIc and IIe versions, confusing consumers. Apple modified the IIe to improve its compatibility with the IIc.

While noting its lack of an internal modem and inability to use expansion cards such as the popular Z-80 SoftCard, BYTE in May 1984 described the Apple IIc as a "head-to-head [competitor] with the IBM PCjr" for novice computer users. Creative Computing agreed, stating in July 1984 that "This war will have no clear winner. Apple fans will buy the IIc, and IBM fans will buy the PCjr. I believe the Apple II will live forever", with the IIc as the "final transmutation" of the Apple II because it was about as small as a computer with a full-sized keyboard and 5 1/4" drive could be. The magazine said in December 1984 that the IIe and IIc were the best home computers with prices above $500, with the IIc better for those using word processing and business software.

== Specifications ==
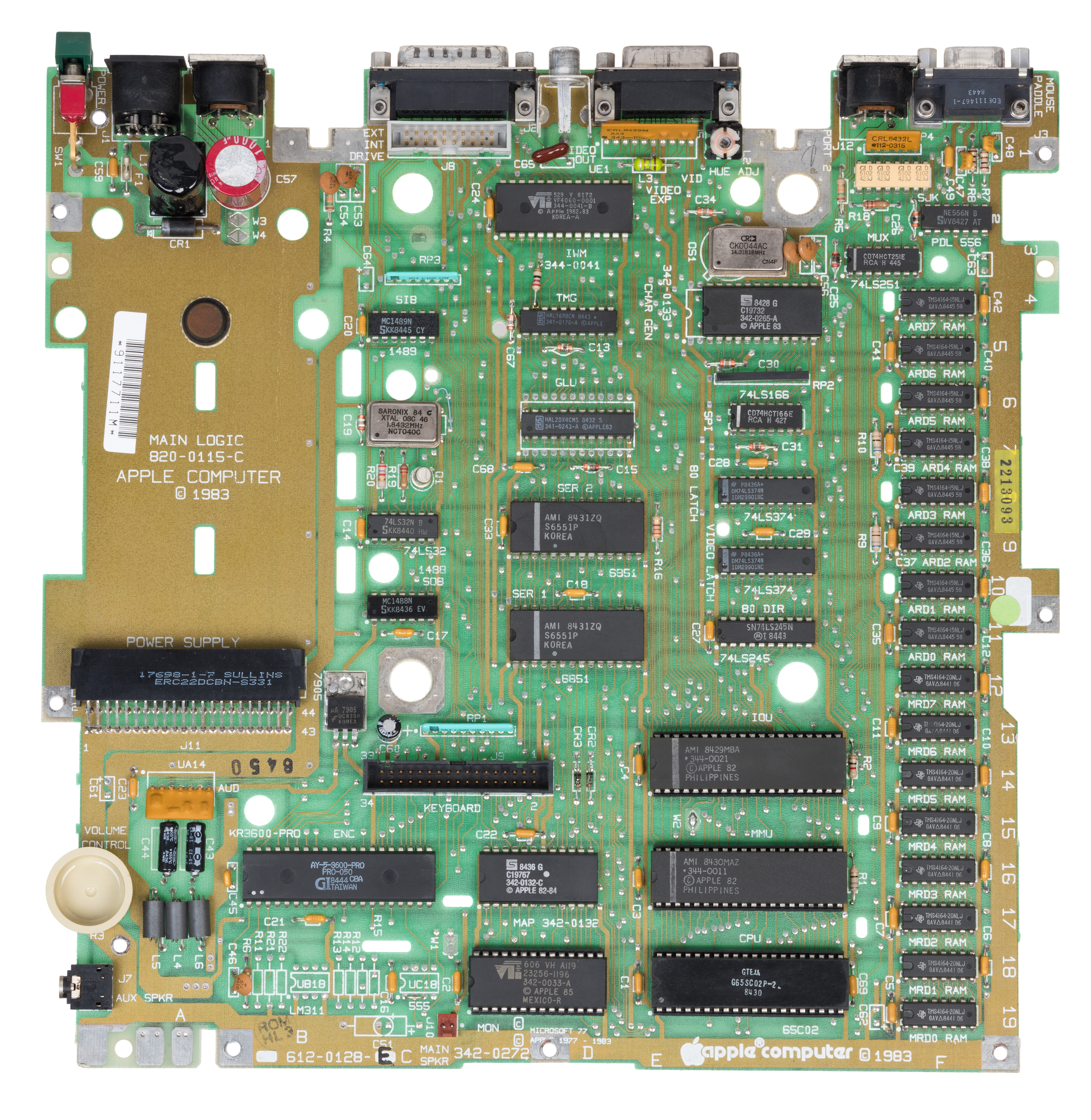
The motherboard of an Apple IIc

- Microprocessor
  - 65C02 running at 1.023 MHz
  - 8-bit data bus
- Memory
  - 128 KB RAM built-in
  - 32 KB ROM built-in (16 KB ROM in original)
- Expandable from 128 KB to 1 MB (only through non-conventional methods in original)
- Video
  - 40 and 80 columns text, with 24 lines
  - Low-Resolution: 40 × 48 (16 colors)
  - High-Resolution: 280 × 192 (6 colors)
  - Double-Low-Resolution: 80 × 48 (16 colors)
  - Double-High-Resolution: 560 × 192 (16 colors)
- Audio
  - Built-in speaker; 1-bit toggling
  - User-adjustable volume (manual dial control)
- Built-in storage
- Slim-line internal 5.25-inch floppy drive (140 KB, single-sided)
- Internal connectors
  - Memory Expansion Card connector (34-pin)*

* Only available on ROM 3 motherboard and higher; original IIc: NONE

- Specialized chip controllers
  - IWM (Integrated Woz Machine) for floppy drives
  - Dual 6551 ACIA chips for serial I/O
- External connectors
  - Joystick/Mouse (DE-9)
  - Printer, serial-1 (DIN-5)
  - Modem, serial-2 (DIN-5)
  - Video Expansion Port (D-15)
  - Floppy drive SmartPort (D-19)
  - 15-Volt DC connector input (DIN-7, male)
  - NTSC composite video output (RCA connector)
  - Audio-out (1/8-inch mono phone jack)

== Revisions ==
The Apple IIc was in production from April 1984 to August 1988, with minor changes. These modifications include three new ROM updates, a bug-fix correction to the original motherboard, a newly revised motherboard, and a slight cosmetic change to the external appearance of the machine. The ROM revision for a specific Apple IIc is determined by entering the Applesoft BASIC programming language and typing in the command PRINT PEEK (64447) which returns the value indicating the particular ROM version.

=== Original IIc (ROM version '255') ===
The initial ROM, installed in machines produced during the first year and a half of production, is 16 KB in size. The only device which can be connected to the disk port is (one) external 5.25-inch floppy drive; software can be booted from this external drive by typing the command PR#7. The serial port does not mask incoming linefeed characters or support the XON/XOFF protocol, unlike all later firmware revisions. There is no self-test diagnostic present in this ROM; holding down the solid-Apple key during cold boot merely cycles unusual patterns on screen which serves no useful purpose or indication of the machine's health.

=== Serial port timing fix ===
Serial ports on Apple IIc motherboards manufactured before December 1984 are 2.9% slower than the Electronic Industries Association standard, greater than the permitted plus or minus 2% variance. Non-Apple modems with speeds greater than 300 baud are incompatible with the ports. The motherboards derive the serial timing through a 74LS161 TTL logic chip. This causes some third-party modems and printers, which operated at 1200 baud or faster, to function improperly. Slower serial devices operating at 300 baud or less are unaffected, as well as some faster devices which can tolerate the deviation. The solution to ensure all devices are compatible is to replace the TTL chip with a 1.8432 MHz crystal oscillator (next to capacitor C19) during manufacture. Apple swapped affected motherboards for users who could prove they had an incompatible serial device (e.g. a third-party 1200-baud modem which presented problems; not all do).

=== UniDisk 3.5 support (ROM version '0') ===
This update, introduced in November 1985, doubles the ROM firmware in size from 16 KB to 32 KB. The new ROM supports "intelligent" devices such as the Apple UniDisk 3.5-inch (800 KB) floppy drive and Smartport-based hardisks, in addition to an external 5.25-inch floppy drive. A new self-test diagnostic is provided for testing built-in RAM and other signs of logic faults. The Mini-Assembler—absent since the days of the Apple II Plus—returned, and new Monitor "Step" and "Trace" commands. The upgraded ROM adds rudimentary support for an external AppleTalk networking device. When attempting to boot virtual slot 7, users see "APPLETALK OFFLINE", but no compliant device was ever released. The upgrade consists of a single chip swap and minor motherboard modification, which Apple provided free only to persons who purchased a UniDisk 3.5 drive. A small sticker with an icon of a 3.5-inch floppy diskette was placed next to the existing 5.25-inch diskette icon above the floppy drive port indicating the upgrade.

=== Memory Expansion IIc (ROM version '3') ===
Introduced in September 1986 simultaneously with the Apple IIGS, this model introduced a new logic board, new keyboard, and new color scheme. The original Apple IIc has no expansion options and required third-party cards to perform various hardware tricks. This can be done by removing the CPU and MMU chips and inserting a special board into these sockets, which uses bank switching to expand memory up to 1 Megabyte (RAM). This is similar to the function of the slots in the original Apple II and II+, and the auxiliary slot in the Apple IIe. The new motherboard has a 34-pin socket for plugging in memory cards directly, which allows for the addressing of up to 1 MB (Megabytes) of memory using Slinky-type memory cards. The onboard chip count was reduced from 16 memory chips (64K×1) to four (64K×4). The new firmware replaces the code for the cancelled AppleTalk networking device with support for memory cards. Bumping out the non-supported AppleTalk functionality, memory now lives in virtual slot 4, and mouse support moved to slot 7. The new keyboard no longer has the rubber anti-spill mat and offers generally more tactile and responsive keys that feel more "clicky". The color of the keyboard, floppy drive latch, and power supply cords are light grey and not "Fog", matching the new Platinum color scheme of the Apple IIGS. The case style is still Snow White. Owners of the previous IIc model were entitled to a free motherboard upgrade if they purchased one of Apple's IIc memory expansion boards; they did not receive the new keyboard or the cosmetic changes.

=== Memory Expansion fix (ROM version '4') ===
In January 1988, a new ROM firmware update was issued to address bugs in the new memory-expandable IIc. Changes include better detection of installed RAM chips, correction of a problem when using the serial modem port in terminal mode, and a bug fix for keyboard buffering. The ROM upgrade was available free of charge only to owners of the memory expansion IIc. This was the final change to the Apple IIc, which was superseded that September by the Apple IIc Plus (with a ROM identified as version '5').

== International versions ==
Like the Apple IIe before it, the Apple IIc keyboard differs depending on what region of the world it was sold in. Sometimes the differences are very minor, such as extra local language characters and symbols printed on certain keycaps (e.g. French accented characters on the Canadian IIc such as "à", "é", "ç", etc., or the British Pound "£" symbol on the UK IIc) while other times the layout and shape of keys greatly differ (e.g. European IIcs). In order to access the local character set, the "Keyboard" switch above the keyboard is depressed, which switches text video from the US character set to the local set. The DVORAK keyboard layout is not available on international IIcs—the feature is intended to switch between international keyboards, and the DVORAK layout is the alternate keyboard on US IIcs. In some countries these localized IIcs also support 50 Hz PAL video and the different 220/240-volt power of that region by means of a different external power supply for the internal 12-volt power converter. The international versions replace any English legends printed on the case (specifically the "keyboard" toggle switch, "Power" and "Disk Use" drive-activity labels) with graphical icons.

== Add-on accessories ==
=== Portability enhancements ===
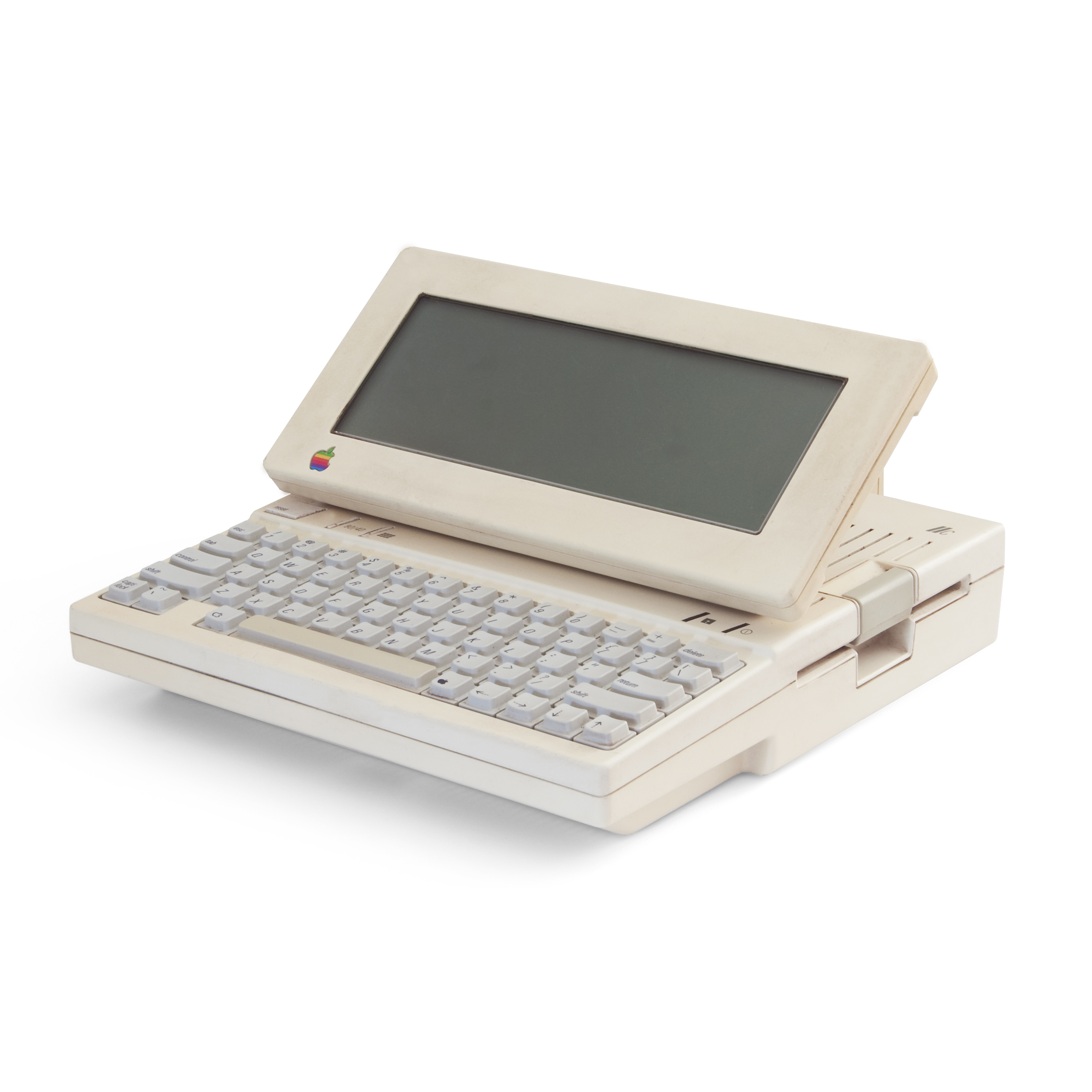
An Apple IIc with the Apple Flat Panel Display attached

At the time of the IIc's release, Apple announced an optional black and white (1-bit) LCD screen designed specifically for the machine called the Apple Flat Panel Display. It became available in early 1985, about three months after the original release date. While it was welcomed as a means of making the IIc more portable, it does not integrate well as a portable solution, not attaching in a secure or permanent manner and not able to fold face down. Instead, it sits atop the machine and connected via ribbon cable to a somewhat bulky rear port connector.

One analyst said that the display is "impossible to read". Apple learned after its initial IIc marketing campaign that the portable market was smaller than estimated, causing the company to describe it instead as easily transportable between home and office; Apple reportedly released the display only to fulfill the initial product announcement. Market analysts estimated that 5-10% of IIc owners would want it. Its main shortcoming is that it suffers from a very poor contrast and no backlighting, making it very difficult to view without a strong external light source. The display has an odd aspect ratio as well, making graphics look vertically squashed. A third-party company would later introduce a work-alike LCD called the C-Vue, very similar to Apple's product, albeit with a reportedly slight improvement in viewability. Consequently, both sold poorly and had a very short market life span, making these displays extremely rare.

Third parties also offered external rechargeable battery units for the Apple IIc (e.g. Prairie Power Portable System available from Roger Coats) with up to eight hours per charge or longer. Although they aid in making the machine more of a true portable, they are nonetheless bulky and heavy, and add more pieces that would have to be carried. Adapter cables were sold as well that allow the Apple IIc to plug into an automobile's DC power cigarette lighter.

To help transport the Apple IIc and its accessory pieces around, Apple sold a nylon carrying case with shoulder strap that has a compartment for the computer, its external power supply, and the cables. It has enough room to squeeze in one of the above-mentioned LCD units. The case is grey in color with a stitched-on Apple logo in the upper right corner.

=== Expansion capabilities ===
Expanding the IIc is difficult since it was designed as a closed system; however, many companies figured out ingenious ways of squeezing enhancements inside the tiny case. Real-time clocks, memory expansion, and coprocessors are popular, and some products combine all three into a single add-on board. Typically, in order to add these options, key chips on the motherboard are pulled and moved onto the expansion board offering the new features, and the board is then placed into the empty sockets. While sometimes a tight squeeze, this offers users without the Memory Expansion IIc a way to add memory.

Applied Engineering offered several "Z-Ram" internal memory expansion boards, which also include Z-80 SoftCard functionality for CP/M capability. Some companies devised a method for squeezing in an entire CPU accelerator product, by means of placing all the specialized circuitry (i.e. cache and logic) into one tall chip that replaces the 40-pin 65C02 microprocessor, speeding up the machine from 4–10 MHz. Notable examples are the Zip Chip and Rocket Chip.

Although the IIc lacks a SCSI or IDE interface, external hard drives were produced by third parties that connects through the floppy SmartPort as an innovative alternative connection method (e.g. ProApp, Chinook). While these specialized hard drives are relatively slow due to the nature of how data was transferred through this interface (designed primarily for floppy drives) they do allow for true mass storage. The CDrive mounts internally and is very fast due to its direct connection to the CPU. Speech and music synthesis products plug into the IIc's serial ports. Three popular such devices are the Mockingboard-D, Cricket, and Echo IIc.

=== General accessories ===
Apple sold the Monitor IIc, a 9 in (23 cm) monochrome CRT display with an elevated stand. The Color Monitor IIc, a 14 in (36 cm) color composite monitor, followed in 1985. A mouse is another popular add-on, especially since it requires no interface card, unlike earlier Apples; MousePaint, a clone of MacPaint, shipped with the IIc's mouse. An Apple external 5.25-inch floppy drive matches the style of the IIc. A later 3.5-inch "intelligent" UniDisk 3.5 drive contains its own miniature computer inside (CPU, RAM, firmware) to overcome the issue of using a high-speed floppy drive on a 1 MHz machine.

Timeline of Apple II family
See also: Timeline of the Apple II series, Timeline of Macintosh models, and Timeline of Apple Inc. products
