= Call-A.P.P.L.E. =

Defunct computer magazine

- March 1985 cover
- Editor: Bill Martens
- Categories: Computer magazines
- Frequency: Monthly
- Circulation: 47,000
- First issue: February 1978
- Company: A.P.P.L.E.
- Country: United States
- Language: English
- Website: www.callapple.org
- ISSN: 8755-4909
- OCLC: 8898855

Call-A.P.P.L.E. is the monthly journal publication of the Apple Pugetsound Program Library Exchange (or A.P.P.L.E.) The magazine was published from 1978 until 1990 when it was discontinued; after a 12-year lapse publication was restarted in 2002. The magazine has covered most aspects of Apple II and Mac computers.

During its original run the magazine focused on the Apple II and related programming content. Currently the magazine continues to have Apple II programming content but also contains reviews and program information for the other Apple computers including the latest hardware and software releases. Call-A.P.P.L.E. also covers emulation of older platforms on the newer machines.

== See also ==
- Apple Pugetsound Program Library Exchange
- List of publications and periodicals devoted to the Apple II
