= Juiced.GS =

US computer magazine

- Vol. 25, Issue 4 (December 2020)
- Editor: Ken Gagne
- Former editors: Max Jones; Ryan M. Suenaga
- Staff writers: Ivan Drucker; Andy Molloy; Peter Neubauer; Andrew Roughan; David Schmidt; Eric Shepherd; Ewen Wannop; Geoff Weiss; Mimi Whalen
- Categories: Apple II
- Frequency: Quarterly
- Publisher: Ken Gagne
- First issue: Winter 1996
- Company: Gamebits
- Country: US
- Based in: Leominster, Massachusetts
- Language: English
- Website: juiced.gs
- ISSN: 2162-7746

Juiced.GS is a print magazine/newsletter for Apple II computer users. Although the name implies a focus on the Apple IIgs, its coverage encompasses all Apple II systems. It is the longest-running Apple II publication and, since 1999, the only Apple II publication still in print as of 2024.

The 20-page magazine/newsletter (with the occasional 24- or 28-page special edition) is published quarterly and mailed to subscribers around the world. Each issue covers the latest Apple II news, including new products and event coverage. There are also frequent product reviews, how-to articles, and technical articles covering programming and even hardware design. Each year's third issue features a cover photo of the staff, taken at KansasFest, and includes extensive coverage of the premiere annual Apple II event.

The publication is available only on a subscription basis, delivered to subscribers via postal mail, though free sample issues are available on the magazine's web site. Juiced.GS subscriptions are annual, currently costing US $20 per calendar year in the United States, $25 in Canada and Mexico and $28 elsewhere in the world. Its 29th annual volume is being published in 2024.

The Juiced.GS domain name could be considered a domain hack.

== History ==
Juiced.GS was founded in 1996 by Max Jones, a senior newspaper editor and devout Apple II enthusiast. What mainly sparked the idea and incentive for creating Juiced.GS was the (then) recent demise of one of the few remaining printed Apple II publications at the time, GS+ Magazine, and he wanted to fill the void. He knew that the Apple IIgs was a very capable machine, and wanted to push its limits by publishing a professional-grade publication with it. The name "Juiced.GS" is derived from one of Max's friends who, upon seeing Max and knowing of his decked-out Apple IIgs system, loaded with peripherals, exclaimed "There's the guy with the juiced GS!"

In 2002, Syndicomm, the founding company of Apple II online resource A2Central, took over the publication while retaining the original staff of writers. Max Jones became (and remains as) editor emeritus, while Ryan Suenaga became editor. In 2006, Suenaga moved on to other endeavors, promoting then-associate editor Ken Gagne to the position of editor-in-chief, beginning with Juiced.GS's 11th annual volume. At KansasFest 2007, Gagne and Shepherd jointly announced that Gagne would take over publishing duties as well, effective immediately. Juiced.GS is now published by Gamebits, a sole proprietorship of Gagne's.

== See also ==
- List of publications and periodicals devoted to the Apple II
