= Apple Performa Plus Display =

Apple Display Monitor

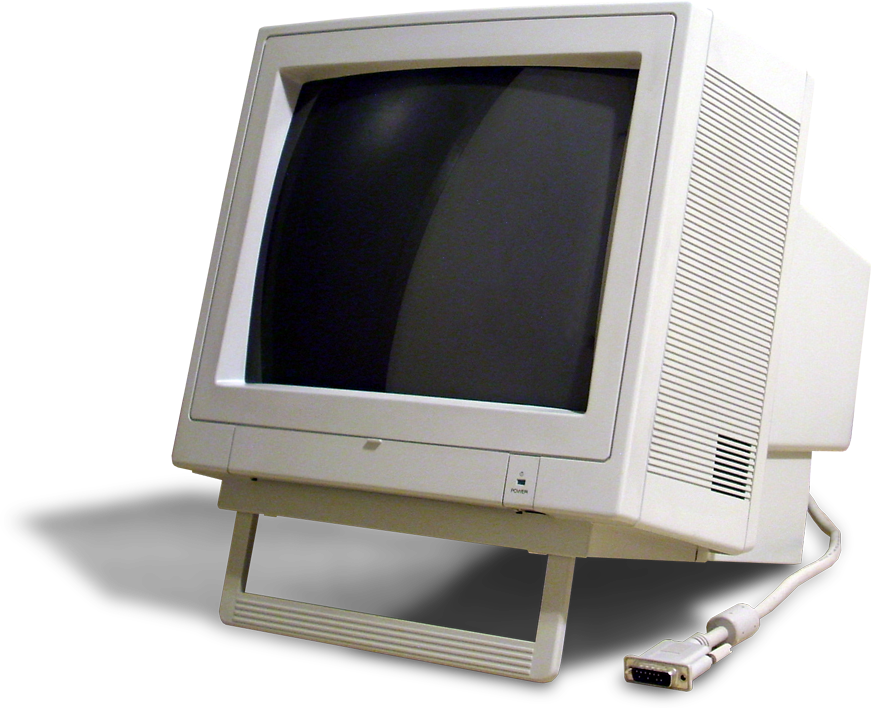
- Manufacturer: Apple Computer
- Type: Shadow mask CRT
- Released: September 1992
- Discontinued: July 1994
- Display: 640x480
- Dimensions: 14″, 13″ viewable

The Apple Performa Plus Display is a color 14″, 13″ viewable shadow mask CRT that was manufactured by Apple Inc. from September 14, 1992, until July 18, 1994. The video cable uses a standard Macintosh DA-15 video connector and its resolution is fixed at 640×480 pixels.
