= Resource Central =

Publishing house in Overland Park, KS

- Industry: Computing Publisher
- Founder: Tom Weishaar
- Defunct: February 1995
- Headquarters: Overland Park, Kansas, United States

Resource Central was an Apple II publishing house in Overland Park, Kansas. It was founded by former Softalk columnist and Beagle Bros software author Tom Weishaar. Resource Central was responsible for many Apple II publications, including:

- Open-Apple: the flagship newsletter, published monthly. Edited by Tom Weishaar, Dennis Doms, Ellen Konowitz Rosenberg.
- A2-Central: Open-Apple was eventually renamed A2-Central to avoid trademark infringement with Apple Computer. In its last year it was distributed in a disk-only version, edited by Doug Cuff.
- A2-Central On Disk: a disk-based version of the newsletter, with supplemental materials to help blind users read the magazine, as well as selected shareware and freeware. Edited by Dean Esmay.
- Script-Central: a publication devoted to Apple's then-popular HyperCard product. Edited by Bruce "HangTime" Caplin and Bo Monroe.
- Studio-City: a publication devoted to the HyperStudio hypermedia product. Edited by Dean Esmay and Bo Monroe.
- HyperActive: a multimedia arts publication

Resource Central also founded the long-running KansasFest conference and expo. Originally called the A2-Central Summer Conference and immediately dubbed "KansasFest" by attendees (combining the name of the other major Apple II event of the time, the AppleFest expo, with Resource Central's location in suburban Kansas City), KFest is still held annually.

Largely forgotten is that, late in Resource Central's lifetime, Tom Weishaar recruited a couple of GEnie denizens to create and publish "Open Windows" in an attempt to orient Apple users to Microsoft Windows. The Open Windows monthly publication lasted one year, and was delivered on a disk in executable ZIP format. When unzipped, the publication ran as a Windows Help file (.hlp) application. Although somewhat popular, it did nothing to revive Resource Central or prevent its demise.

Resource Central went out of business in February 1995.

In July 2010, it was announced that the entire Open-Apple and Resource Central catalog was reclassified to the Creative Commons 3.0 Attribution License.
