= Computist =

American magazine

- September 1986 cover
- Categories: Computer magazine
- Publisher: SoftKey Publishing
- Founded: 1981
- Final issue Number: 1993; 89
- Country: United States
- Based in: Tacoma, Washington
- Language: English

Computist was a computer magazine devoted to the Apple II that was published by Charles R. Haight under the SoftKey Publishing name, between 1981 and 1993, for a total of 89 issues. The magazine was based in Tacoma, Washington. Originally launched as Hardcore Computing, the 'hardcore' part was formally dropped from the title with the 27th issue.

Only three volumes of Core were published: "All About Graphics", "Utilities" and "Home Computer Games".

Originally, the "Games" topic was scheduled for Issue 4, but that issue was scrapped and "Games" became the theme for Issue 3. The "Databases" topic originally planned for Issue 3 later appeared as a feature article in Hardcore Computist #6. Core itself became a regular featured column in Hardcore Computist.

While it was billed as a magazine "for the serious user of Apple computers", in fact much of the content in Computist was devoted to the removal of copy protection from Apple software. At the time, it was commonplace for software publishers to prevent users from making copies of software by distributing the programs on floppy disks that had been written with a modified version of Apple DOS. Each issue of Computist included several "SoftKeys", short code snippets and instructions designed to circumvent software copy protection routines. Often these SoftKeys were designed to be used in conjunction with a program called Super IOB, which could reconstruct the publisher's DOS modifications, circumventing the copy protection for a particular program or group of programs. Typically, following the steps in a published SoftKey resulted in a disk free of protection, which could be duplicated with any disk copier, such as Apple's COPYA program.

Early in its run, Computist was the subject of controversy, when other computer magazines of the day (notably Nibble, Creative Computing and Compute!) refused to run ads for Haight's publications, citing their unwillingness to promote what they viewed as the facilitation of widespread software piracy; (they had also vetoed ads for bit copy programs, such as Essential Data Duplicator (E.D.D.) and Locksmith). Letters debating the merits of piracy versus the free exchange of information and the right of users to make legitimate backups of their programs, were exchanged between Haight and the other editors; several of these appeared in early issues of Hardcore Computist. When Creative Computing later closed down, Computist ran an obituary in Issue 28, reprinting one of its previous articles about the debate, as well as a response from a CC editor, George Blank.

The magazine changed formats several times, going from a thick cardboard-style cover with color graphics, to lighter paper stock covers with expanded content and increased page count; and finally to a large format (11" by 17") newspaper style publication. This last, beginning with issue 66, was intended as a cost-saving measure as subscriptions and reader contributions began to fall off with the waning popularity of the Apple II line. The final issue (#89) listed only four contributors, including Krakowicz, whose "submission" was nothing more than a section of his series on cracking protected software that had been circulating the BBS community for a while.
