= Nibble (magazine) =

Apple II focused magazine

- Final issue
- Publisher: MicroSPARC
- First issue: January 1980
- Final issue: July 1992
- Country: USA
- Based in: Lincoln, Massachusetts
- Language: English
- ISSN: 0734-3795
- OCLC: 421716813

Nibble was a magazine for Apple II personal computer enthusiasts published from 1980 until 1992. The name means "half a byte" or "four bits." The proper spelling for a half-byte is "nybble", riffing off of the term "byte". Most of the articles incorporated the source code of a small to medium-sized utility, application program, or game (each written specifically for the magazine) and a detailed description of how it worked. The headquarters was in Lincoln, Massachusetts.

== History ==
The magazine was first published in January 1980 by Mike Harvey. Originally published eight times per year, by 1984 the magazine had attained a popularity that allowed it to become a monthly publication. It was published for more than twelve years; the July 1992 issue was the last.

The magazine also published checksum tables that, with utilities available from the magazine, helped pinpoint the location of any errors in a reader's own typed-in copy. The programs were also available on disk for a small fee for those who did not want to spend the time to type them in.

A technical highlight of Nibble was a regular column called Disassembly Lines, in which Dr. Sanford Mossberg presented assembly listings he had reverse-engineered from interesting parts of Applesoft BASIC and the Apple DOS to illustrate how they worked. Later Mossberg turned his attention to the Apple IIGS and dissected its Toolbox and operating system as well.

Omnibus editions of the best articles from each year's issues, dubbed Nibble Express, were published annually. The magazine also published other books that repurposed magazine material on various topics, such as games, personal finance programs, and "Apple secrets." Mossberg's Disassembly Lines columns were also collected in four volumes.

Harvey's publishing company, MicroSPARC (later MindCraft), published a number of Apple II programming utilities including an assembler and a BASIC-like set of macros for it. These were sold by mail-order from ads in the magazine. (Trivia: the company changed its name after Sun Microsystems bought the name MicroSPARC for a new line of processors.)

A spinoff Macintosh publication, Nibble Mac, was first a section in Nibble and then was published separately. Like the original, Nibble Mac focused on hobbyist programming, notably HyperCard.

Most of the Nibble material, including Nibble Mac, is now available again from the publisher through his Web site.
