= Karl Roelofs =

American video game developer (born 1964)

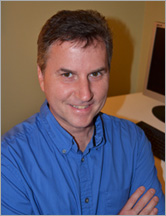
- Born: September 11, 1964 (age 61)
- Occupation(s): Creative Director and Producer at Zojoi, LLC
- Years active: 1985–present
- Employers: Castle Hill Studios; ICOM Simulations; Infinite Ventures; Kesmai Studios; Viacom New Media; Video Gaming Technologies; Zojoi
- Notable work: Beyond Shadowgate; Dracula Unleashed; Shadowgate; Shape Shifter; Sherlock Holmes: Consulting Detective
- Style: Fantasy; Mystery
- Website: zojoi.com

Karl Roelofs (born September 11, 1964) is an American video game developer known for creating the MacVenture game Shadowgate. He is a co-founder of the video game development company Zojoi, LLC with Dave Marsh.

== Biography ==
=== ICOM Simulations ===
Karl Roelofs began his career in video game development in 1985 when his best friend Dave Marsh enlisted him to help with designing a video game for ICOM Simulations. Karl had wanted to be a writer and saw an opportunity in Dave's offer. He accepted the chance to design and write a fantasy adventure game and began working with Dave to create their first game together which would later be called Shadowgate. Karl was hired at ICOM Simulations in 1987 after the company had already released its first two MacVenture games, Déjà Vu: A Nightmare Comes True, Uninvited, and while working on and finishing Shadowgate.

Karl and Dave were not fully aware of how successful the games they developed were at the time as they were mostly focused on porting the MacVenture games to as many computer systems as possible. Together with Dave, Karl worked on a sequel to Shadowgate called Beyond Shadowgate which was to be the next Shadowgate MacVenture title. The game was four times larger than the original Shadowgate and had been fully designed and scripted, but ICOM Simulations got a contract with NEC to develop for the TurboGrafx-16. ICOM decided to shift their focus from adventure games to side scrolling and top-down action games. This prompted a redesign of Beyond Shadowgate for the TurboGrafx-CD as a hybrid side-scrolling and adventure game.

In 1993, ICOM Simulations was purchased by Viacom, Inc. and renamed to "Viacom New Media". Karl began to work on games based on MTV and Nickelodeon properties, such as Nickelodeon GUTS and Rocko's Modern Life: Spunky's Dangerous Day. After Viacom shut down Viacom New Media in 1998, Karl Roelofs went on to work for brief stints at Konami of America and Kesmai Studios/Electronic Arts. A highlight of this period was his involvement in an online version of the Settlers of Catan for MSN Zone.

Then he joined a new company with his friend Dave Marsh and another former employee of ICOM Simulations: Eugene Evans. Eugene was the founder and president of a new video game production company called Infinite Ventures, and had obtained the rights to ICOM Simulation's original intellectual properties, including Shadowgate. Together, Karl worked with them to create what was intended to be the "next generation" world of Shadowgate.

=== Zojoi ===
On March 7, 2012, Karl Roelofs co-founded Zojoi, LLC with Dave Marsh. They had reacquired the rights to the ICOM Simulations properties which included the rights to Shadowgate, Uninvited, and Déjà Vu I and II and materials such as the master recordings for the Sherlock Holmes: Consulting Detective games.

The first project from Zojoi was a Kickstarter crowd funding campaign to remaster the Sherlock Holmes: Consulting Detective mysteries and release them for iOS and Android tablets as well as Windows and OS X platforms. The campaign had a funding goal of $55,000 and ran for 44 days. However, it only received $17,430 in pledges and did not succeed.

Despite the unsuccessful Kickstarter campaign, Karl and Dave were able to obtain funding through other means for the Sherlock Holmes: Consulting Detective mysteries. The first three mysteries were released on September 18, 2012, over iTunes for the iPad 2 and newer models, and on October 7, 2012, over Desura for Windows and OS X. Karl and Dave took their experience with the campaign for Sherlock Holmes: Consulting Detective and applied what they had learned for their next Kickstarter campaign for Shadowgate. Instrumental to this was that Shadowgate would be re-imagined and that it be in pre-production so that they could clearly communicate their vision through visuals, audio, and art.

On October 26, 2012, the Kickstarter campaign for Shadowgate went live with Karl Roelofs appearing beside Dave Marsh in the campaign pitch video. It had a funding goal of $120,000 and was set to last for 31 days. The campaign was successful and raised $137,232 in pledges by November 25, 2012. With that funding, the new re-imagined Shadowgate moved into production. If the reception to the new revision of Shadowgate is great enough, Karl and Dave have expressed an interest in developing their original vision for the sequel, Beyond Shadowgate, as well as bringing back re-imagined versions of Uninvited and Déjà Vu I and II .

== Games ==
Release date	Title	Developer	Publisher	Platform	Credit
1985	Déjà Vu	ICOM Simulations	Mindscape	Amiga; Apple II; Commodore 64; PC	Artist / Producer
1986	Uninvited	ICOM Simulations	Mindscape	Macintosh	Artist / Producer
1987	Shadowgate	ICOM Simulations	Mindscape	Macintosh	Game Designer / Artist
1988	Déjà Vu II: Lost in Las Vegas	ICOM Simulations	Mindscape	Macintosh	Artist
1991	Sherlock Holmes: Consulting Detective	ICOM Simulations	ICOM Simulations	PC	Game Designer / Artist
1992	Sherlock Holmes: Consulting Detective Vol. II	ICOM Simulations	ICOM Simulations	PC	Game Designer / Artist
1992	Road Runner's Death Valley Rally	ICOM Simulations	Sunsoft	SNES	Additional Design
1993	Sherlock Holmes: Consulting Detective Vol. III	ICOM Simulations	ICOM Simulations	PC	Game Designer / Artist
1993	Beyond Shadowgate	ICOM Simulations	Turbo Technologies Inc.	TurboGrafx-CD	Original Concept
1993	Shape Shifter	ICOM Simulations	Turbo Technologies Inc.	TurboGrafx-CD	Game Designer
1993	Dracula Unleashed	ICOM Simulations	Viacom New Media	PC	Game Designer
1993	Daffy Duck: The Marvin Missions	ICOM Simulations	Sunsoft	SNES	Additional Design
1994	Bugs Bunny Rabbit Rampage	Viacom New Media	Sunsoft	SNES	Additional Design
1994	Rocko's Modern Life: Spunky's Dangerous Day	Viacom New Media	Viacom New Media	SNES	Game Designer
1994	Nickelodeon GUTS	Viacom New Media	Viacom New Media	SNES	Producer
1997	Broken Helix	Konami	Konami	PS1	Additional Design
1999	Shadowgate Classic	Infinite Ventures	Kemco	GBC	Game Designer
1999	Déjà Vu I & II: The Casebooks of Ace Harding	Kemco	Vatical Entertainment	GBC	Game Designer
2001	Air Warriors III: Millenium Version	Kesmai	I-Magic; Electronic Arts	PC	Live Producer
2005	Catan: The Computer Game	Castle Hill Studios	MSN Games	PC	Co-Producer / Artist
2005–2011	50 Five-Reel and Three-Reel Mechanical Slot Machine Titles	Video Gaming Technologies	Video Gaming Technologies	Slot machine	Creative Services Manager

== Patents ==
In addition to his video game credits, Karl Roelofs is also the inventor of a published patent for a gaming machine and method. The patent describes a game play mechanism for gaming machines wherein certain icons obtained from the spinning reels could be saved in a separate grid, and then called back in blank areas of the reel in order to complete a winning combination. Karl created this patent while he was working at Video Gaming Technologies. It was applied for on February 1, 2008, and was granted by the US patent office on January 17, 2012.

== See also ==
- ICOM Simulations
- MacVenture
- Sherlock Holmes Consulting Detective
- Zojoi
