= Dave Marsh (game developer) =

American video game designer (born 1964)

David R. Marsh
- Born: November 5, 1964 (age 60)
- Other names: Dave Belltower
- Occupation(s): Founder & President of Zojoi, LLC
- Years active: 1985–present
- Employers: Castle Hill Studios; ICOM Simulations; Infinite Ventures; Kesmai Studios; Viacom New Media; Video Gaming Technologies; Zojoi
- Notable work: Beyond Shadowgate (2024); Dracula Unleashed; Shadowgate; Shape Shifter; Sherlock Holmes: Consulting Detective; The Solstice Treaty
- Style: Fantasy; Mystery
- Website: zojoi.com

David R. Marsh (born November 5, 1964) is an American video game designer known for his work supporting the intellectual properties that used to belong to ICOM Simulations, and creating the MacVenture game Shadowgate. As of 2012, he recently founded a new game development company called Zojoi, LLC with plans to release new, remastered and revised versions of games created by him and Karl Roelofs when they were at ICOM Simulations.

== Biography ==
=== ICOM Simulations ===
In the mid-1980s, Dave Marsh started his career in game development by developing projects and creating graphics with an Apple II. He met programmer Terry Schulenburg from ICOM Simulations after they had released their first MacVenture game: Déjà Vu: A Nightmare Comes True in 1985. Terry told Dave about the kind of games they were working on and lent one of ICOM's Macintosh 128K systems to him. Dave enlisted the help of his friend Karl Roelofs, and together the two began working on their first complete game which would eventually become Shadowgate.

Dave officially joined ICOM Simulations in April–May 1985, and began working as an artist on the 2nd MacVenture game: Uninvited and as an artist and producer on the PC ports of the first MacVenture game, Déjà Vu. Karl came on board soon after, and the two continued designing and developing Shadowgate while working on the other MacVenture games. One of the issues that Dave and Karl had to deal with in making Shadowgate was the size constraints of the floppy disks. Some of the puzzles and rooms that were designed had to be cut in order for there to be enough space to fit them on the disks.

In the early 1990s, with the rise in CD-ROM technology, the higher ups at ICOM Simulations decided to move away from adventure games in favor of side-scrollers and action games. Adventure games that Dave and Karl were involved in, such as Beyond Shadowgate (NES) and The Awakening, were cancelled and ICOM secured a contract with NEC to develop for the TurboGrafx-16. In addition to the more action oriented games, Dave and Karl also were heavily involved working on games that used live actors and full motion video, such as Sherlock Holmes: Consulting Detective, to make use of the latest technological advancements.

Two major changes happened at ICOM Simulations while Dave was there. On July 5, 1991, Tod Zipnick, the founder and principal shareholder of ICOM Simulations, died of Hodgkin's Disease at the age of 35. In May 1993, ICOM Simulations was purchased by Viacom, Inc. as part of the media conglomerate's expansion into interactive media. ICOM Simulations was then renamed to Viacom New Media and changed the focus of the games Dave and the company would develop for the next four years.

=== Viacom New Media ===
After ICOM Simulations became Viacom New Media, Dave began working on producing games based on licensed properties, primarily those of MTV and Nickelodeon. Some of these games included Rocko's Modern Life: Spunky's Dangerous Day and Beavis and Butt-head. In 1998, Viacom shut down Viacom New Media and sold off its intellectual properties.

One of Viacom New Media's former employees was Eugene Evans, formerly of Mythic Entertainment, who had founded his own company called Infinite Ventures. He contacted Dave and got his help in securing most of ICOM Simulation's intellectual properties, including Shadowgate.

=== Infinite Ventures ===
With ICOM Simulation's library of games in their possession, Eugene Evans worked with Dave Marsh and Karl Roelofs to revitalize Shadowgate and the other MacVenture games.

They also re-released higher quality versions of all three volumes of the Sherlock Holmes Consulting Detective Video Mysteries and Dracula Unleashed as Interactive DVD games that could be played on any DVD Player.

In 2008, Infinite Ventures closed down and the intellectual properties of ICOM Simulations remained in the possession of Infinite Venture's Karla Knickerbocker. In January 2012, Dave Marsh approached Karla with an interest to secure the rights to the ICOM Simulations library of games.

=== Zojoi ===
On March 7, 2012, Dave founded Zojoi, LLC with fellow ICOM Simulations and Infinite Ventures veteran, Karl Roelofs. On the Zojoi company website, they state their mission as follows:

Our goal is to bring both exciting versions of classic titles (many of which defined entire genres) and new games to PC's, Macs and tablets!

— Zojoi Homepage,

On March 16, 2012, Zojoi launched a Kickstarter crowd funding campaign to help fund the development of a remastered version of the original nine Sherlock Holmes: Consulting Detective mysteries. Dave Marsh appeared in the pitch video for the project to describe what he and his company wanted to do. They had set a funding goal of $55,000 for their campaign, and offered rewards that would allow backers to become an additional part of the game, such as by writing an important article for in game copies of The London Times.

Unfortunately, the campaign ended on April 28, 2012 after raising $17,430: 31% of their target goal. This meant that Dave and Zojoi would not get any funding at all as outlined in Kickstarter's guidelines. Despite this turn of events, Dave stated in an update on the campaign page that he and Zojoi would still work towards remastering and releasing Sherlock Holmes: Consulting Detective, even though it would take longer to raise the money necessary to finish the work.

On September 18, 2012, the first three Sherlock Holmes: Consulting Detective mysteries were released on iTunes for the iPad 2 and newer iPad models. The Windows and OS X version of the same three mysteries were later released via Desura on October 7, 2012.

Dave's next project was to revitalize Shadowgate, and on October 26, 2012, Zojoi launched a Kickstarter campaign for it. Dave and Karl both appeared in the pitch video, and were offering physical rewards including recreations of the "Staff of Ages" used in the game and a Shadowgate card game called Quests of Shadowgate designed by Coleman Charlton of Iron Crown Enterprises and Mayfair Games. Their target goal for this campaign was set at $120,000 and would last for 31 days.

Unlike previous releases of Shadowgate, the version Dave Marsh and Karl wanted to make would be different. Dave stated that the game would be a "re-imagining" of Shadowgate where new puzzles that were cut from the original game would be added in along with other brand new puzzles. Some puzzles and rooms would also be removed or altered so that the solution to solving the room's puzzle in the new game would be different than in previous releases.

The campaign met its funding goal with about two days left before the end of the campaign. When it ended on November 25, 2012, it raised $137,232 in pledges from 3,468 backers. Not only did the campaign meet its target funding goal, but its first stretch-goal as well. With the campaign's success, Dave began production on Shadowgate at Zojoi. As of December 24, 2012, Zojoi is still accepting pledges via PayPal in case anyone else wanted to pledge and assist in reaching the next stretch goal, and Dave is currently working on the game's development.

== Games ==
| Release date | Title | Developer | Publisher | Platform | Credit |
|---|---|---|---|---|---|
| 1985 | Déjà Vu | ICOM Simulations | Mindscape | Amiga; Apple II; Commodore 64; PC | Artist / Producer |
| 1986 | Uninvited | ICOM Simulations | Mindscape | Macintosh | Artist / Producer |
| 1987 | Shadowgate | ICOM Simulations | Mindscape | Macintosh | Game Designer / Artist / Producer |
| 1988 | Déjà Vu II: Lost in Las Vegas | ICOM Simulations | Mindscape | Macintosh | Artist |
| 1991 | Sherlock Holmes: Consulting Detective | ICOM Simulations | ICOM Simulations | PC | Art director |
| 1992 | Sherlock Holmes: Consulting Detective Vol. II | ICOM Simulations | ICOM Simulations | PC | Art director |
| 1992 | Road Runner's Death Valley Rally | ICOM Simulations | Sunsoft | SNES | Game Designer / Producer |
| 1993 | Sherlock Holmes: Consulting Detective Vol. III | ICOM Simulations | ICOM Simulations | PC | Art director |
| 1993 | Shape Shifter | ICOM Simulations | Turbo Technologies Inc. | TurboGrafx-CD | Game Designer / Producer |
| 1993 | Dracula Unleashed | ICOM Simulations | Viacom New Media | PC | Producer |
| 1993 | Daffy Duck: The Marvin Missions | ICOM Simulations | Sunsoft | SNES | Executive Producer |
| 1994 | Bugs Bunny Rabbit Rampage | Viacom New Media | Sunsoft | SNES | Executive Producer |
| 1994 | Rocko's Modern Life: Spunky's Dangerous Day | Viacom New Media | Viacom New Media | SNES | Game Designer / Producer |
| 1996 | Beavis and Butt-head in Little Thingies | Viacom New Media | Viacom New Media | PC | Executive Producer |
| 1996 | Beavis and Butt-head in Wiener Takes All | Viacom New Media | Viacom New Media | PC | Game Designer / Producer |
| 1998 | Aliens Online | Mythic Entertainment | Kesmai | PC | Executive Producer |
| 1998 | Starship Troopers Online | Mythic Entertainment | Kesmai | PC | Executive Producer |
| 1999 | Shadowgate Classic | Infinite Ventures | Kemco | GBC | Game Designer |
| 1999 | Déjà Vu I & II: The Casebooks of Ace Harding | Kemco | Vatical Entertainment | GBC | Game Designer |
| 2001 | Multiplayer BattleTech 3025 | Kesmai | Electronic Arts | PC | Co-Producer |
| 2001 | Silent Death: Online | Kesmai | GameStorm | PC | Executive Producer |
| 2003–2011 | 150 Slot Machine Titles | Video Gaming Technologies | Video Gaming Technologies | Video Slot Machine | Creative Director |
| 2024 | Beyond Shadowgate | Zojoi, GrahfMetal | Zojoi | PC | Original design document Executive Producer |

== See also ==
- ICOM Simulations
- MacVenture
- Sherlock Holmes Consulting Detective
- Zojoi
