= Beyond Shadowgate (2024 video game) =

2024 video game

- Developers: Zojoi; Grahfmetal
- Publisher: Zojoi
- Directors: Studio Shinigami; Christian Moseley
- Designer: Christian Moseley
- Programmer: Jason Canam
- Artist: Jeff "GrahfMetal" Canam
- Writer: Christian Moseley
- Composer: Orie Falconer
- Series: Shadowgate
- Engine: GameMaker Studio 2
- Platform: Windows
- Release: September 19, 2024
- Genre: Adventure
- Mode: Single-player

Beyond Shadowgate is a point-and-click adventure game developed by Zojoi and Grahfmetal Games and published in 2024. It is a sequel to the Nintendo Entertainment System version of Shadowgate, which itself is a port of the original 1987 Macventure game.

== Gameplay ==
Beyond Shadowgate retains the first-person perspective and classic point-and-click puzzle-solving design of the original 1987 game. The player explores 250 unique rooms in a variety of environments.

As in the 1987 game, there are many humorous or grisly player deaths, although modern design choices prevent dead ends or game failure. Torches are absent from the game, removing any resource limitations from the original.

The adventure also features cameo segments from other ICOM MacVenture titles, including Uninvited and Déjà Vu.

== Plot ==
The game is set decades after the events of Shadowgate. The player character, a Fenling named Del, begins the game imprisoned in a castle dungeon. Guided by a wisp companion who provides hints and objectives, Del esapes and discovers a conspiracy threatening the kingdom.

Over the course of his journey through many new environments, Del encounters allies, enemy creatures, and specters from the past tied to Castle Shadowgate. The story expands upon the original's lore by including more dialogue, character interactions, and narrative detail than its predecessor.

== Development ==
Although titled Beyond Shadowgate, the 2024 release is unrelated to the 1993 TurboGrafx-16 game of the same name. In the early 1990s, Shadowgate co-creator Dave Marsh had written a script and design document for a sequel, but those materials were largely discarded by the TurboGrafx-16 team. The 2024 project draws more directly from Marsh's original vision.

Development was handled by Zojoi, rights holders to the ICOM properties, in partnership with indie developer GrahfMetal Games. GrahfMetal had previously created retro-inspired adventures Spectacle and Infested, themselves homages to the MacVenture style. The team aimed to recreate the look and feel of the NES title while expanding its size and complexity.

A Kickstarter campaign launched in February 2023 was successfully funded with more than US$120,000 and reached all of its stretch goals.

The soundtrack was composed by Orie Falconer, who had also worked on GrahfMetal's earlier games.

== Reception ==
Adventure Game Hotspot gave the game a 73% rating, noting the game would appeal to fans of the original but might alienate newer players unfamiliar with old school point-and-click adventures.

Kurt Kalata of Harcore Gaming 101 gave the game a positive review, stating the larger game world made the experience much grander than the original and any flaws could be attributed to the game emulating a specific older type of adventure game.

Stuart Gipp of Retronauts called Beyond Shadowgate "a brilliant adventure game of a unique breed," praising the writing, puzzle design, soundtrack and graphical aesthetic. He notes that the game streamlines the gameplay of the original Shadowgate in a way that "eschews frustration and provokes interest."
