= Sherlock Holmes Consulting Detective (disambiguation) =

Sherlock Holmes: Consulting Detective may refer to:

- Sherlock Holmes: Consulting Detective (gamebook) (1981), a book-based game published by Sleuth Publications
- Sherlock Holmes: Consulting Detective (1991), a video game adapted by ICOM Simulations from the Sleuth Publications gamebook
- Sherlock Holmes: Consulting Detective Vol. II (1992), sequel to the 1991 video game
- Sherlock Holmes: Consulting Detective Vol. III (1993), sequel to the 1992 video game
