= Warlock Lord =

Warlock Lord or Lord Warlock may refer to:

- "Warlock Lord", a character from Shannara
- "Warlock Lord", a character from the videogame Shadowgate
- "Warlock Lord", a character from the videogame Shadowgate 64: Trials of the Four Towers
- "Lord Warlock", a character from the anime Genesis Survivor Gaiarth
- "Lord-Warlock", a character from Warhammer's Skaven (Warhammer)

== See also ==
- Warlock (disambiguation)
- Lord (disambiguation)
