= Yo Bro =

1991 video game

- Developer: ICOM Simulations
- Publisher: NEC
- Producers: Peter Sills, Gary Koffler
- Designers: David Marsh, Karl Roelofs
- Programmers: Michael Garber, Boris Remus
- Artists: Todd Papaleo, Jeff Troutman, Brian Babendererde
- Series: Camp California
- Platform: TurboGrafx-16
- Release: NA: c. September 1991
- Genre: Run and gun
- Mode: Single player

Yo Bro (Note: As rendered in the box art. It is also rendered as Yo' Bro on the HuCard and Yo, Bro on the in-game title screen. Also occasionally rendered as Yo' Bro!) is a run and gun video game released in 1991 by NEC for the TurboGrafx-16. It was developed by ICOM Simulations and based on Camp California, a set of mascot characters for The Beach Boys. Players take control of Little Bro, a skateboarding bear who defends various Californian cites from a series of experimental creatures. Synthesized renditions of four Beach Boys songs are included in the game. It released exclusively in North America for the HuCard format. In 1993, a sequel was released titled Camp California for the TurboGrafx Super CD-ROM². Critics consider it to be playable despite unwieldy controls and poor graphics.

== Gameplay ==
Yo Bro is a top-down run and gun video game where players take control of a skateboarding bear named Little Bro. In each of the six levels, set in different Californian cities such as Santa Cruz and San Francisco, the evil Professor Liverhosen has placed deadly experimental creatures which the player is tasked with destroying. These creatures, including giant carnivorous plants, killer bees, and man-eating rabbits, can kill bystander children leaving skeletal remains scattered among the streets. The player can save these children by running into them. Little Bro is initially equipped with a slingshot to fight enemies which can be upgraded using power-ups dropped from enemies. Other weapons can also be found, such as freeze rays and rocket launchers.

Arrangements of four Beach Boys songs are included as background tracks in the game, "California Girls", "Help Me, Rhonda", "I Get Around", and "Fun, Fun, Fun".

Little Bro navigates the streets of east Santa Cruz which are littered with killer bees, dogs on hoverboards, and the corpses of dead children

== Development ==
Yo Bro was developed by ICOM Simulations for NEC, the manufacturer and American distributor of the TurboGrafx-16. Previously ICOM had developed the MacVenture series for home computers. In 1990, ICOM announced they would be partnering with NEC to bring two CD games to the TurboGrafx-16, Sherlock Holmes: Consulting Detective and Camp California. The later was planned around the Camp California characters, a set of anthropomorphic surfing animals which had recently been designated the official mascots of the rock band The Beach Boys. The game was one of the first products licensed based on these characters. Camp California was initially planned as "sports adventure" game with four minigames tied together with an overarching narrative. It was also announced to include CD-quality renditions of various Beach Boys songs.

By March 1991, the game had become a top-down action game and renamed to Yo Bro, with both a HuCard and CD-ROM release planned. At Summer CES in June 1991, two Camp California games were displayed: Yo Bro (now a HuCard exclusive) and a side-scrolling platformer named Camp California for the CD-ROM. Yo Bro released a few months later. According to Lardmark Entertainment Group, at least 30,000 copies were sold. Camp California was later released in 1993 for the TurboGrafx Super CD-ROM².

== Reception ==
TurboPlay magazine called Yo Bro a "slightly better than average game" with "many hours of enjoyable play." They criticized the graphics, saying there were not up to the quality standards expected from the TurboGrafx and called the controls difficult to get used to "like a real skateboard." Clayton Walnum of VideoGames & Computer Entertainment agreed that the controls were hard to get used to and the graphics disappointing. He did consider the arranged Beach Boys' to be a nice bonus and considered the game to have "hours of fun" once mastered. Electronic Gaming Monthly reporting on the Winter CES version of the game called it "some of the best skateboardin' action anywhere." Brett Weiss in 2011 wrote that it was "playable, but the controls could use some fine tuning."
