= Beyond Shadowgate =

Beyond Shadowgate may refer to:

- Beyond Shadowgate (1993 video game), a 1993 point-and-click adventure video game for TurboGrafx CD
- Beyond Shadowgate (2024 video game), a 2024 point-and-click adventure video game for Windows
