= Beyond Shadowgate (1993 video game) =

1993 video game

- Cover art
- Developer: ICOM Simulations, Inc.
- Publisher: Turbo Technologies Inc.
- Directors: Dave Marsh; Karl Roelofs
- Platform: TurboGrafx CD
- Release: NA: October 1993
- Genre: Adventure
- Mode: Single player

Beyond Shadowgate is a TurboGrafx CD sequel to the 1987 Mac and MacVenture game Shadowgate. Unlike its predecessor, Beyond Shadowgate is a classical point-and-click adventure viewed from a platform perspective.

A 14 by 19 inch poster by veteran role-playing game artist Jim Holloway, who also created the game's opening and closing animation sequences, was folded inside the jewel case for the game.

== Plot ==
The player controls Prince Erik, the descendant of the hero from the first game, Lord Jair. When Prince Erik returns to his home country, he finds out about his father's murder. The Prince is framed by the minister of the late king, who imprisons him where the adventure starts.

== Gameplay ==
As in Shadowgate, the player must solve a series of puzzles throughout the castle in order to proceed to the end of the game. Prince Erik can move around, examine, manipulate, and take objects. Commands also allow ducking and punching. Traps and puzzles may cause the death of the character if they are not correctly solved.

== Development ==
The game was very loosely based on a design document for a NES game of the same name. As stated by one of the original designers of Shadowgate, Dave Marsh, the game lacked a player base since it was the sole installment of the series available on the platform. The NES game was eventually released in 2024 for the PC.

== Reception ==
Electronic Gaming Monthly gave the game a 7.5 out of 10. They criticized the slow pacing but praised the eerie mood, the graphics, the intellectually stimulating puzzles, and the ability to interact with nearly every item in the game. GamePro called Beyond Shadowgate "an enticing action/adventure RPG that combines the intricate puzzles of the original Shadowgate with a new graphic 3D environment." They also expressed approval for the realistic level of sound effects and the multiple routes through the game.

== See also ==
- ICOM Simulations
- Zojoi
