= ICOM Simulations =

American software company

ICOM Simulations, Inc.
- Type: Private (defunct)
- Industry: Software
- Founded: March 4, 1981
- Founder: Tod Zipnick
- Defunct: February 14, 1998
- Fate: Dissolved
- Headquarters: Wheeling, Illinois
- Key people: Tod Zipnick (President); Rick Maningas (Vice President); Dennis Defensor (President); Darin Adler (Primary Developer)
- Products: MacVenture; Sherlock Holmes: Consulting Detective; Beavis and Butt-Head in Virtual Stupidity
- Number of employees: 25 (1989); 45 (1991)
- Website: N/A

ICOM Simulations, Inc. (later known as Rabid Entertainment) was a software company based in Wheeling, Illinois. It is best known for creating the MacVenture series of adventure games including Shadowgate.

Following the foundation in 1981 a number of game titles for the Panasonic JR-200 were produced. Later products for the Apple Macintosh included the debugger TMON and an application launching utility called OnCue.

== History ==
ICOM Simulations was formed as TMQ Software on March 4, 1981, by Tod Zipnick. With the MacVenture series, ICOM pioneered the point-and-click adventure interface and later multiplatform CD-ROM development with Sherlock Holmes: Consulting Detective. Zipnick died of Hodgkin's disease in 1991 just as the company was beginning to take off.

In 1990, ICOM announced they would be partnering with NEC to bring games to the TurboGrafx-16, including Sherlock Holmes: Consulting Detective, one of the first console video games to feature full motion video cutscenes. In the early-to-mid 1990s, ICOM Simulations was a major third-party developer for the TurboGrafx-16 and developed a number of games for the console, including the TG-16 exclusive Shadowgate sequel, Beyond Shadowgate.

The company was acquired in 1993 by Viacom New Media which closed its operations in 1997. Renamed to Rabid Entertainment and operated as a division of Virgin Interactive, VNM/ICOM was dismantled in 1998 and one of its titles, Septerra Core, was picked up by another developer.

The rights to ICOM's game portfolio were held by the company Infinite Ventures, but they are now owned by David Marsh who obtained most of the rights in January 2012. On March 5, 2012, Dave Marsh and Karl Roelofs, both former developers at ICOM Simulations, formed a new game development company called Zojoi, LLC, and have begun releasing upgraded versions of previous ICOM Simulations titles, starting with Sherlock Holmes: Consulting Detective for iOS Tablets.

== Games ==
Title	Release date	Credited As	Published By	Platform
Déjà Vu: A Nightmare Comes True	July 10, 1985 (NA)	ICOM Simulations	Mindscape	Macintosh, Apple IIGS, Atari ST, Commodore 64, NES, Game Boy
Uninvited	March 1, 1986 (NA)	ICOM Simulations	Mindscape	Macintosh, Apple IIGS, Atari ST, Commodore 64, NES
Shadowgate	July 30, 1987 (NA)	ICOM Simulations	Mindscape	Macintosh, Apple IIGS, Atari ST, Commodore 64, NES
Déjà Vu II: Lost in Las Vegas	1988	ICOM Simulations	Mindscape	Macintosh, Apple IIGS, Atari ST, Game Boy Color
Addams Family, The	1991	ICOM Simulations	NEC Technologies	TurboGrafx-CD
Yo' Bro	1991	ICOM Simulations	NEC Technologies	TurboGrafx-16
Sherlock Holmes: Consulting Detective	1991	ICOM Simulations	ICOM Simulations	PC
Sherlock Holmes: Consulting Detective Vol. II	1992	ICOM Simulations	ICOM Simulations	PC
Road Runner's Death Valley Rally	1992	ICOM Simulations	Sunsoft	Super NES
Ghost Manor	1992	ICOM Simulations	Turbo Technologies Inc.	TurboGrafx-16
Shape Shifter	October 1, 1992 (NA)	ICOM Simulations	Turbo Technologies Inc.	TurboGrafx-CD
Sherlock Holmes: Consulting Detective Vol. III	1993	ICOM Simulations	ICOM Simulations	PC
Beyond Shadowgate	1993	ICOM Simulations	Turbo Technologies Inc.	TurboGrafx-CD
Camp California	1993	ICOM Simulations	Turbo Technologies Inc.	TurboGrafx-CD
Daffy Duck: The Marvin Missions	1993	ICOM Simulations	Sunsoft	Super NES
Dracula Unleashed	October 24, 1993 (NA)	ICOM Simulations	Viacom New Media	PC
Bugs Bunny Rabbit Rampage	1994	Viacom New Media	Sunsoft	Super NES
Nickelodeon GUTS	1994	Viacom New Media	Viacom New Media	Super NES
MTV: Club Dead	1994	Viacom New Media	Viacom New Media	Macintosh, PC
Are You Afraid of the Dark? The Tale of Orpheo's Curse	1994	Viacom New Media	Viacom New Media	Macintosh, MS-DOS
Rocko's Modern Life: Spunky's Dangerous Day	April 1994	Viacom New Media	Viacom New Media	Super NES
Beavis and Butt-Head	November 1994	Viacom New Media	Viacom New Media	Sega Genesis, Super NES, Game Gear
Congo: Descent Into Zinj	1995	Viacom New Media	Viacom New Media	PC, Classic Mac OS
Phantom 2040	June 1995	Viacom New Media	Viacom New Media	Sega Genesis, Super NES, Game Gear
Zoop	June 1995	Viacom New Media	Viacom New Media	Sega Genesis, Super NES, Game Boy, Game Gear, PlayStation
Aaahh!!! Real Monsters	August 15, 1995	Viacom New Media	Viacom New Media	Sega Genesis, Super NES
Beavis and Butt-Head in Virtual Stupidity	August 31, 1995	Viacom New Media	Viacom New Media	PlayStation, PC
Beavis and Butt-head in Little Thingies	1996	Viacom New Media	Viacom New Media	PC
Beavis and Butt-head in Wiener Takes All	1996	Viacom New Media	Viacom New Media	PC
Beavis and Butt-head in Calling All Dorks	1996	Viacom New Media	Viacom New Media	PC
MTV: Slamscape	1996	Viacom New Media	Viacom New Media	PlayStation
DeathDrome	October 31, 1996	Viacom New Media	Viacom New Media	PC
Beavis and Butt-head in Screen Wreckers	1997	Viacom New Media	Viacom New Media	Macintosh, PC

== See also ==
- Zojoi
