= Dracula Unleashed =

1993 video game

- Developer: ICOM Simulations
- Publishers: Viacom New Media; Sega (Sega CD)
- Director: Mike Plant
- Producer: David Marsh
- Designers: Anthony Sherman; David Marsh; Karl Roelofs; Katherine Tootelian
- Programmer: Fred Allen
- Artist: Katherine Tootelian
- Writers: Anthony Sherman; Andrew Greenberg; William Bridges
- Composer: Byte-Size Sound
- Platforms: MS-DOS, Classic Mac OS, Sega CD, DVD
- Release: 1993
- Genre: Adventure
- Mode: Single-player

Dracula Unleashed is a video game created by ICOM Simulations and published in 1993 by Viacom New Media for MS-DOS, Mac, and Sega CD.

It was one of the earliest games to focus on full-motion video as an integral part of gameplay.

== Plot ==
The player assumes the identity of a young Texas businessman named Alexander Morris, who has come to London during the winter of 1899 to research the strange surroundings involving his brother Quincey's death 10 years earlier. In the process, he meets an English woman named Annisette Bowen and becomes engaged to marry her.

Due largely to their "extremely close relationship", Quincey's good friend, Lord Arthur Holmwood, has proposed Alexander's induction into the mysterious and exclusive Hades Club. However, Alexander Morris soon discovers a part of his brother's life he had no knowledge of: Quincey Morris was part of a group which destroyed the legendary vampire, Count Dracula.

As Alexander Morris, the player must travel to specific locations in London at certain times with certain items gathered throughout Morris' travels in order to gather clues about the events which occur during the game and achieve victory over Dracula.

Alexander's inquires lead him to learn that a vampire known as the "bloofer lady" has been sighted in London, who he later identifies as a friend of Annisette whose husband was also a member of the Hades Club. Alexander and his allies manage to kill the bloofer lady at her funeral with a stake but discover that Dracula has kidnapped Annisette and taken her to the Hades Club which are revealed to be responsible for Dracula's resurrection. At the Club, Alexander learns that Dracula had killed Holmwood months before his arrival and has been impersonating him ever since. The Count attacks Annisette and Alexander until they manage to uncover several wall mounted crucifixes, causing the room to cave in and impale Dracula with a beam, destroying him.

== DVD ==
In 2002, Infinite Ventures, Inc. released the game on DVD. The game is identical in play, but uses full-screen, DVD-quality video. It also has a "behind the scenes" featurette, as well as some audio bloopers.

There are some minor differences between the DVD version and the Sega CD and PC versions:

- The woodblock carving-style still graphics displayed as backgrounds in many locations and during several exposition scenes in the Sega CD version are not present in the DVD version.
- The Sega CD version had several different carriage driver phrases, spoken whenever the carriage was used to change locations. These are not present in the DVD version. However, some of the lines can still be heard being performed in the bloopers.
- In the PC and Sega CD versions it is possible to be arrested at night when spying on a character at the bookstore. The DVD does not include this, possibly because the event happens at random in the other versions and because of the lengthy save-game procedure in the DVD version. The scene is included as an extra on the DVD.
- During the intro and ending credits as well as some climactic points in the story, the PC and Sega CD versions included Carl Orff's "O Fortuna" as a music cue. The DVD version has replaced these cues with a synthesized variation on the tune.
- During some scenes in the game, the PC and Sega CD versions would cut away to still illustrations, particularly when someone is describing a past event. The DVD version does not cut away in the same scenes.

== Development ==
The game had a budget of more than $2 million.

== Parental advisory ==
When it was released for the Sega CD, it was given an MA-13 label by the Videogame Rating Council. The game has a spooky atmosphere and musical score, along with some images of blood and a campy bookstore owner. It was also reviewed by BBFC and attributed a 15 rating.

== Reception ==
Reception

Review scores
Publication	Score
Electronic Gaming Monthly	8/10, 8/10, 6/10, 7/10 (SCD)
Electronic Games	90% (PC)

Computer Gaming World in January 1994 called the PC version of Dracula Unleashed ICOM Simulations's "most compelling interactive adventure yet" and "the most effective 'interactive movie' to date". The reviewer compared it to Dark Shadows and MacVenture games such as Uninvited, and approved of the improvements on the Sherlock Holmes: Consulting Detective series' graphics and user interface. He concluded that "computer and theater have been brought one step closer together". In April 1994 the magazine said that players "can count on many hours of haunting play ... Live actors and sets add a strong cinematic realism", with "memorably creepy performances throughout", recommending the game to "anyone with more than a passing interest in the horror genre". GamePro gave the Sega CD version a positive review. They criticized that the slow-moving cursor and long load times can make the game painfully slow, but highly praised the audio, gameplay, and "well-acted and nicely staged video", especially the "eerie" dream sequences. Electronic Gaming Monthly commented that despite the full motion video being excessively grainy, the riveting storyline and "excellent" soundtrack keep the player invested in the game.

James V. Trunzo reviewed Dracula Unleashed in White Wolf #41 (March, 1994), giving it a final evaluation of "Excellent" and stated that "Dracula Unleashed will be overly praised in some quarters and unfairly dismissed in others. The truth is that the game delivers in a way not seen before. Bram Stoker might have enjoyed interacting with this product. What else can I say?"
