= Video Information System =

Multimedia device

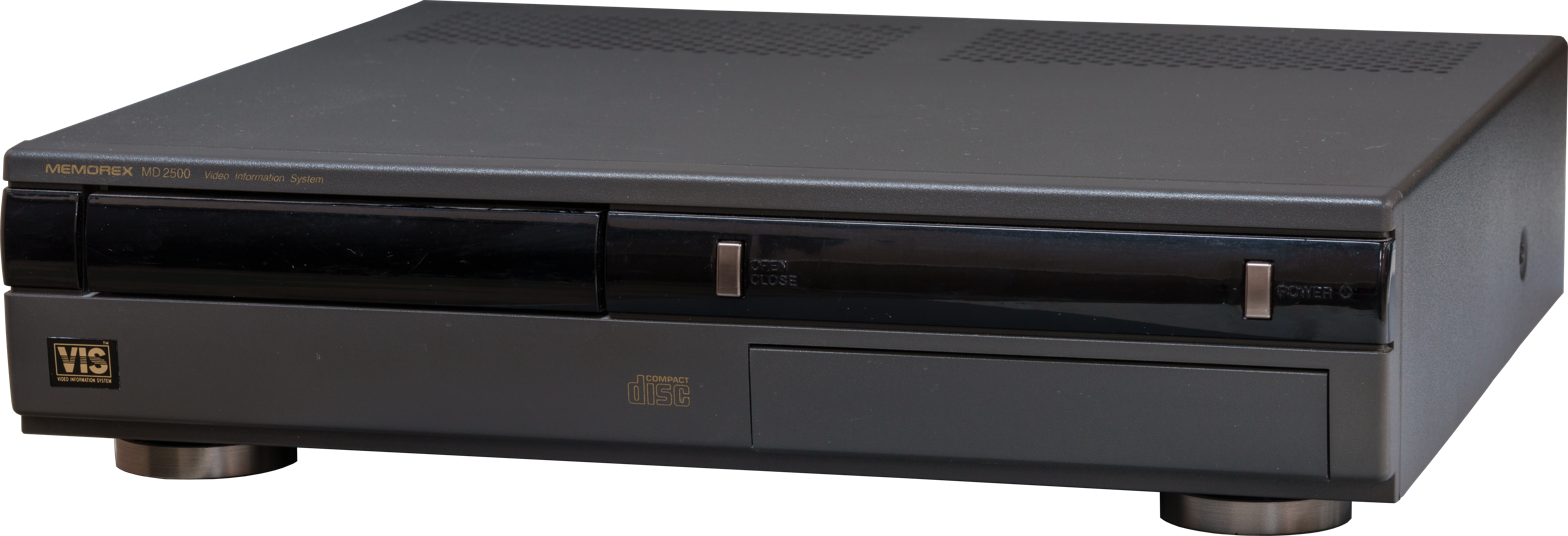
- Developer: Tandy
- Manufacturer: Radio Shack
- Type: Home multimedia entertainment / Home video game console
- Generation: Fourth generation
- Released: 1992 - 1994
- Introductory price: US$699 (equivalent to $1,604 in 2025)
- Units sold: 11,000
- Media: CD-ROM
- Operating system: Microsoft Modular Windows
- CPU: AMD N80L286-12/S @ 12 MHz
- Memory: 1 MB
- Removable storage: Dallas Semiconductor plug-in CyberCard
- Display: NTSC TV or composite monitor; Composite, RF and S-Video out
- Graphics: Cirrus Logic
- Sound: Yamaha YMF262-M
- Input: Mouse, keyboard
- Controller input: hand controller

The Tandy Memorex Video Information System (VIS) is an interactive, multimedia CD-ROM player produced by the Tandy Corporation starting in 1992. It is similar in function to the Philips CD-i and Commodore CDTV systems (particularly the CDTV, since both the VIS and CDTV were adaptations of existing computer platforms and operating systems to the set-top-box design). The VIS systems were sold only at Radio Shack, under the Memorex brand, both of which Tandy owned at the time.

== Modular Windows ==
Logo for Modular Windows

Modular Windows is a special version of Microsoft Windows 3.1, designed to run on the Tandy Video Information System. Microsoft intended Modular Windows to be an embedded operating system for various devices, especially those designed to be connected to televisions. However, the VIS is the only known product that actually used this Windows version. It has been claimed that Microsoft created a new, incompatible version of Modular Windows ("1.1") shortly after the VIS shipped. No products are known to have actually used Modular Windows 1.1.

== Reception ==
The VIS was not a successful product; by some reports Radio Shack only sold 11,000 units during the lifetime of the product. Radio Shack store employees jokingly referred to the VIS as "Virtually Impossible to Sell". Tandy discontinued the product in early 1994 and all remaining units were sold to a liquidator.

== Spinoffs ==
- While Modular Windows was discontinued, other modular, embedded versions of Windows were later released. These include Windows CE and Windows XP Embedded.
- VIS applications could be written using tools and techniques similar to those used to write software for IBM PC compatible personal computers running Microsoft Windows. This concept was carried forward in the Microsoft Xbox.

== Specifications ==
Details of the system include:

- CPU: 80286 AMD (N80L286-12/S)
- Video System: Cirrus Logic
- Sound System: Yamaha (YMF262-M)
- Chipset: NCR Corporation
- CDROM ×2 IDE by Mitsumi
- OS: Microsoft Modular Windows

Additional details:

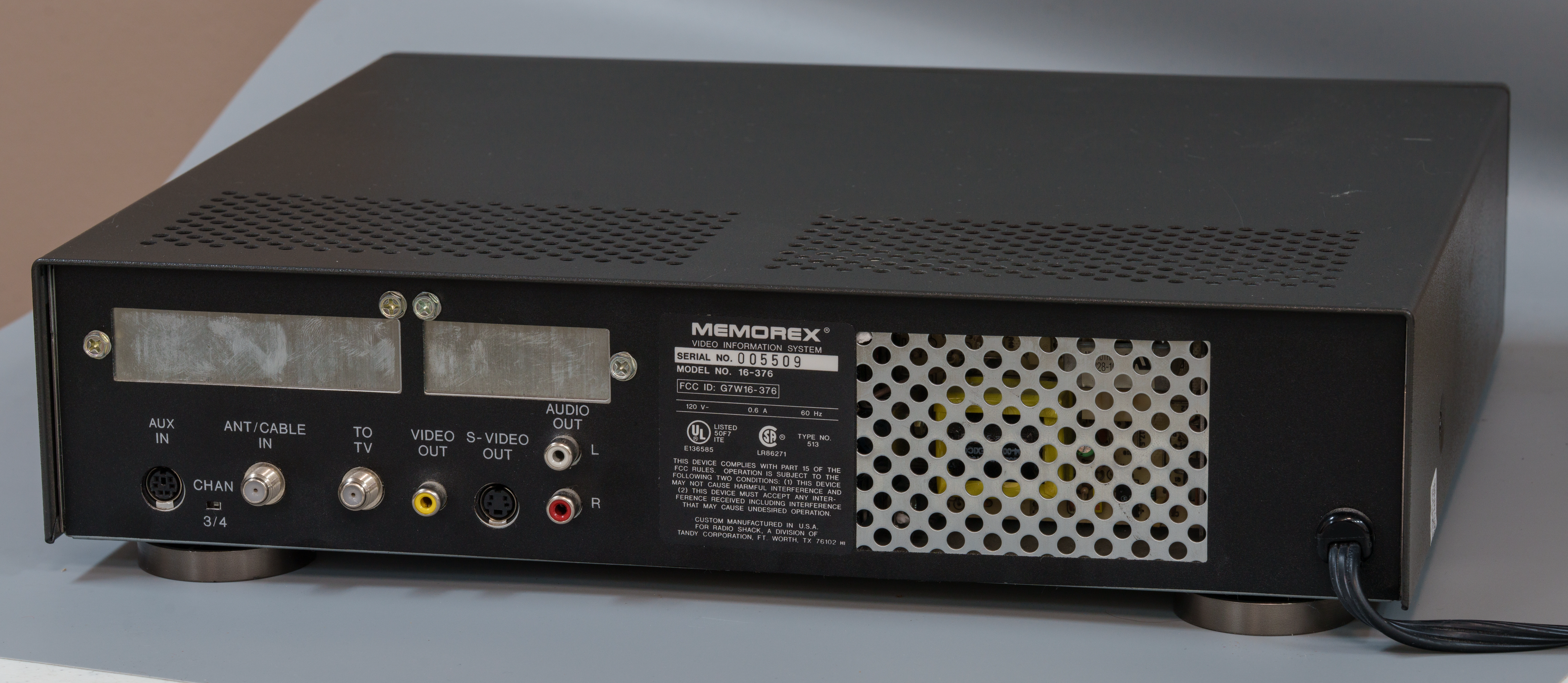
- Tandy VIS Back I/O Panel
  Intel 80286 processor on a local bus (not ISA) running at 12 MHz. 0-wait states. Equivalent PC performance somewhere around that of a 386SX at 16 or 20 MHz.
- 1 MB of ROM containing minimal MS-DOS 3.x, a few drivers, and Modular Windows.
- Built-in Audio CD player application.
- 1 MB of RAM in a conventional PC layout 640 KB + 384 KB.
- Mitsumi 1× (150 KB/s) CD-ROM drive with 16-bit interface, 800 ms access, 1300 ms worst case access, CD+G capable, but not Photo CD. 5000 hour MTBF.
- IR interface with up to two IR transmitters (hand controllers) operating at once.
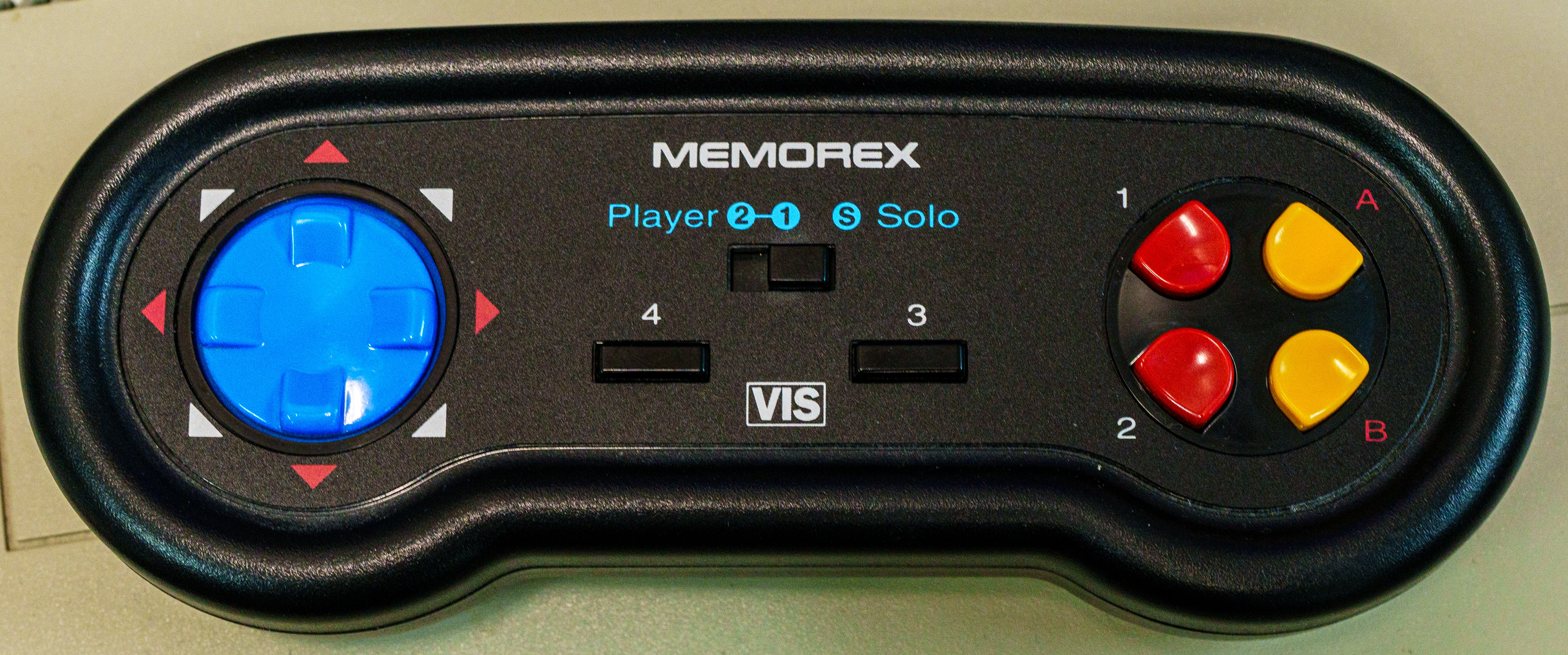
- Tandy VIS Infrared Controller
  PS/2 mouse or keyboard interface (either can be connected and are generally recognized by applications). A wired hand controller could also be connected to this port for use in locations where the wireless controller was not practical, or could be used in conjunction with one wireless controller.
- Expansion compartment for RS-232 serial board for use with Windows debugger.
- Modem (the same modem card that went in the Tandy Sensation I) could also be installed in the VIS. 2400 data 4800 send-only FAX.
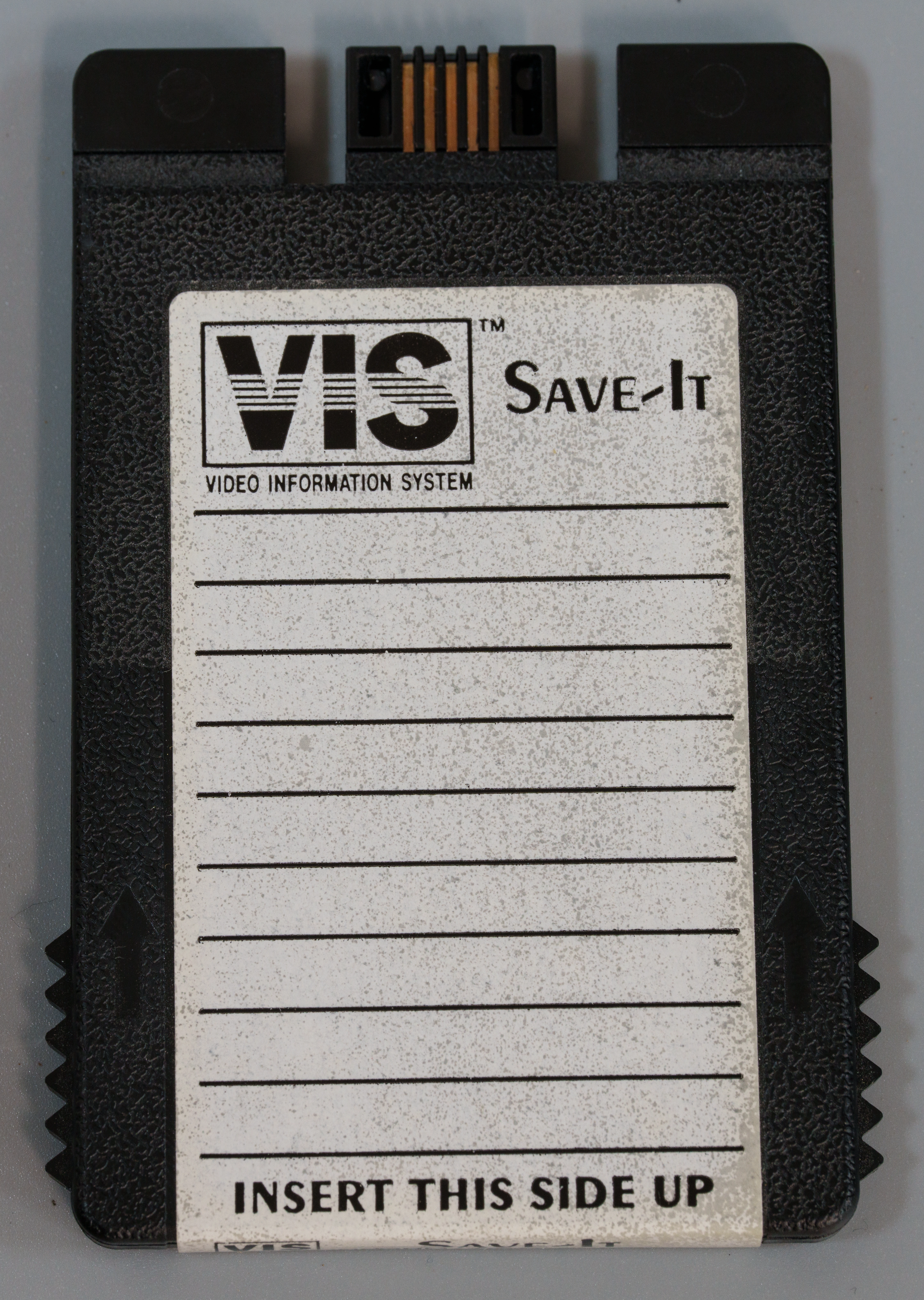
  Tandy VIS Save-It SRAM by Dallas Semiconductor
- Outputs: RCA Line left/right, composite video, RF video, S-Video. NTSC video.
- Dallas Semiconductor plug-in CyberCard - removable non-volatile storage, in sizes up to 512 KB and system comes with a 32 KB unit.
- Onboard audio is same as Tandy Sensation I: Adlib Gold compatible, not Sound Blaster compatible.
- Video uses ADAC-1 chip as found in Tandy Sensation I, supports YUV and several high-quality color modes. Also supported some TV-specific features for handling overscan.

== Software ==
=== Games ===
Title	Publisher
The Adventures of Victor Vector & Yondo: Adventure No. 1 – The Vampire's Coffin	Sanctuary Woods
Kid-Fun	Mindplay
Links: The Challenge of Golf	Access Software
The Manhole: New and Enhanced!	Activision
Mosaic Magic	Kinder Magic Software
Mutanoid Math Challenge	Legacy Software
Mutanoid Word Challenge	Legacy Software
Our House (featuring The Family Circus)	Con•text Systems, Incorporated
Playing with Language: Games in English	Syracuse Language System
Playing with Language: Games in French	Syracuse Language System
Playing with Language: Games in German	Syracuse Language System
Playing with Language: Games in Japanese	Syracuse Language System
Playing with Language: Games in Spanish	Syracuse Language System
Race the Clock	Mindplay
Rick Ribbit: Adventures in Early Learning	Tadpole Productions
Rodney's Funscreen	Activision
The Secrets of Hosea Freeman	Audubon
Sherlock Holmes: Consulting Detective Vol. I	ICOM Simulations
Sherlock Holmes: Consulting Detective Vol. II	ICOM Simulations
SmartKids Challenge One	Arkeo
Talking Stepping Stones: Bonus Pack	Computeach

=== Multimedia ===
Title	Publisher
1992 Time Magazine Compact Almanac, The	TIME Magazine
America's National Parks	Xiphias
American Heritage: Illustrated Encyclopedic Dictionary	Xiphias
American Vista	Applied Optical Media Corporation
Americans in Space	
Astrology Source	Multicom
Atlas of U.S. Presidents	Applied Optical Media Corporation
Better Homes and Gardens: Healthy Cooking	
Better Not Get Wet, Jesse Bear	
Bible Lands, Bible Stories	Context
Compton's MultiMedia Encyclopedia: VIS Edition	
December 24th	Macmillan New Media
Discis Books Multimedia: The Cask of Amontillado – Edgar Allan Poe	Discis
Discis Books Multimedia: The Necklace – Guy de Maupassant	Discis
Discis Books Multimedia: The Tell-Tale Heart – Edgar Allan Poe	Discis
Fitness Partner	
Great Lives Series: Interactive Biographies of American Heroes Vol. 1	The JLR Group
Henry and Mudge: The First Book	Macmillan New Media
Henry and Mudge in the Sparkle Days	Macmillan New Media
Kids Can Read! A Long Hard Day at the Ranch – Audrey Nelson	Discis
Kids Can Read! Aesop's Fables	Discis
Kids Can Read! Cinderella – The Original Fairy Tale	Discis
Kids Can Read! Heather Hits Her First Home Run by Ted Planos	Discis
Kids Can Read! Moving Gives Me a Stomach Ache – Story by Heather McKend	Discis
Kids Can Read! Mud Puddle – Robert N. Munsch	Discis
Kids Can Read! Scary Poems for Rotten Kids written by Sean O Huigin	Discis
Kids Can Read! The Night Before Christmas – Clement C. Moore LLD	Discis
Kids Can Read! The Paper Bag Princess – Robert N. Munsch	Discis
Kids Can Read! The Tale of Benjamin Bunny – Beatrix Potter	Discis
Kids Can Read! The Tale of Peter Rabbit – Beatrix Potter	Discis
Kids Can Read! Thomas' Snowsuit – R. Munsch	Discis
Learn to Play Guitar Volume 1	Parallax Publishing
The Meeting of Minds Series: Interactive Games of History, Art, Music, and Ideas	The JLR Group
Mercer Mayer's Just Grandma and Me	
Multimedia Animals Encyclopedia	Applied Optical Media Corporation
My Paint	
The New Basics Electronic Cookbook	Xiphias
Our House featuring The Family Circus	Context
Peter and the Wolf: A Multimedia Storybook	
Sail with Columbus	Parallax Publishing
Search for the Sea	
A Survey of Western Art: The Electronic Library of Art	
Time Table of History: Arts and Entertainment – 1993 Edition	Xiphias
Time Table of History: Business, Politics & Media – 1993 Edition	Xiphias
Time Table of History: Science and Innovation – 1993 Edition	Xiphias
Title Sampler	
Video Movie Guide 1993	Ballantine Books
Vision: Multimedia Bible for the Entire Family	Context
Wild Animals!	
World Vista	Applied Optical Media Corporation
