= Rocko's Modern Life: Spunky's Dangerous Day =

1994 video game

- Developer: Viacom New Media
- Publisher: Viacom New Media
- Producer: Dave Marsh
- Designer: Brian Babendererde
- Programmers: Roman Scharnberg; Boris Remus
- Composer: Mark Miller
- Platform: Super NES
- Release: NA: April 1994
- Genre: Puzzle platformer
- Mode: Single-player

Rocko's Modern Life: Spunky's Dangerous Day is a puzzle-platform game released by Viacom New Media for the Super Nintendo Entertainment System (SNES). Based on the Nickelodeon series Rocko's Modern Life (1993–1996), it is the first project of Viacom New Media, the interactive entertainment software division of Viacom International, who owned Nickelodeon. In each of the game's sections, the player acts as the titular character guiding his dog Spunky to a golden fire hydrant. To do this, he alters the level environment and fights enemies.

Produced by Dave Marsh, Rocko's Modern Life: Spunky's Dangerous Day was developed in under 12 months during the show's creation, and the only source material to reference were rough sketches sent by artists working on the TV series. Viacom New Media published the game in North America in April 1994 to generally favorable reviews from professional critics, although some reviewers suggested the difficulty would be too much for the game's young target demographic and was artificially increased by the difficult and unresponsive controls. The presentation was well-received for how it reflected the series.

Limited Run Games re-released the game on modern platforms in a collection called the Nickelodeon Splat Pack alongside Aaahh!!! Real Monsters (1995) and GUTS (1994) on January 30, 2026.

== Gameplay ==
The beach level of Rocko's Modern Life: Spunky's Dangerous Day. Rocko uses the level environment to move Spunky to safe areas. In this case, he jumps on the chair to spring Spunky onto the higher deck.

Spunky's Dangerous Day is a puzzle-platform game similar to Lemmings (1991), Mario & Wario (1993) and The Lost Vikings (1993). There are four areas, each with four levels: a beach, a junkyard, a backyard, and a laundromat. In each section, Spunky gets distracted by objects such as mops, frisbees, and ice cream vendors and goes after them without any awareness of the hazards around him; the player acts as Rocko manipulating parts of the level environment to safely guide Spunky to a golden fire hydrant. In the first level, for example, Rocko uses rafts to transport Spunky across water, jumps on lawn chairs and pulley system knobs to get Spunky to higher platforms, and protects Spunky from crabs and sea gulls. Difficulty modes include easy and hard. On easy, the player can pan through the entire stage when the game is paused, a feature not present on hard.

Rocko can jump, duck, punch, perform a quick succession of kicks, swipe his tail at enemies, and pick up objects; he can also change Spunky's walking direction by picking him up. Along the way, the player collects power-ups for Spunky and Rocko to utilize. For Spunky, there are food items that increase Spunky's health, a balloon that inflates Spunky for Rocko to kick him all over the level, bones that temporarily halt Spunky, shields that make Spunky invincible for a period of time, chili peppers that speed him up, green grunge that slows him down, and extra lives. For Rocko, there are short-term invincibility shields as well as lighting that temporarily increases his speed and springs that make him jump higher. Some items are in areas too small for Rocko to enter, meaning Spunky has to obtain them. In addition to golden fire hydrants to end the level, progress is tracked by Spunky collecting fire hydrants as checkpoints, as well as passwords at the end of every 4th section.

== Development and release ==
Rocko's Modern Day: Spunky's Dangerous Day, an adaptation of Rocko's Modern Life (1993–1996), was the first project of Castro Valley, California-located Viacom New Media, the interactive entertainment software division of Viacom International. Their intention was to produce games based on shows airing on MTV and Nickelodeon, two networks owned by Viacom. Lasting shy of 12 months, development of Rocko's Modern Life: Spunky's Dangerous Day began before the formation of Viacom New Media and during the creation of the TV series. The team had no animations of the characters to refer to and had to base the game's graphics on concept sketches sent to them by the show's animators. The backgrounds and colors were created in an improvisational manner. The fact that the game was developed before the series aired also resulted in the theme song not being used and the stages being based on the show's earliest episodes, one named after the pilot, "Trash-O-Madness". Although the titular character would appear in other Nickelodeon ensemble games, Rocko's Modern Life: Spunky's Dangerous Day is the only video game as of 2020 to be primarily about the show.

Producer Dave Marsh led a team of background artists Jarod Prano, Tony Sherman and Brian Babendererde, animators Tom Zehner, Jarod Pranno and Alisa Kober, and programmers Boris Remus and Roman Scharnberg. With Babendererde as lead designer, Kober, Marsh, Remus, Zehner, and Scharnberg were designers, as well as Karl Roelofs and Nickelodeon product manager Donna Friedman. Stephen Gass was credited as creative director, and Michele Jabloner as creative consultant. Carol Balkcom is also credited for executive support. The game was previewed in magazines such as GamePro, Electronic Gaming Monthly, and Game Players, before its release by Viacom New Media in April 1994 in North America.

== Reception ==
Reception

Review scores
Publication	Score
Electronic Gaming Monthly	9/10, 8/10, 5/10, 5/10
Game Informer	7.25/10
Game Players	83%
GameFan	36/50, 38/50, 39/50
GamePro	4.5/5, 4.5/5, 4/5, 5/5
Hyper	79%
Nintendo Power	3.6/5, 2.7/5, 3.2/5, 3.3/5
VideoGames & Computer Entertainment	8/10
Ação Games	12/16
Electronic Games	B+

Critics regarded Rocko's Modern Life: Spunky's Dangerous Day as a promising and strong first effort from Viacom New Media, getting them excited for the developer's later projects, such as Beavis and Butt-Head in Virtual Stupidity (1995). Electronic Games journalist Bill Kunkel called the game "clever" and "thoughtfully designed".

Reviewers considered its difficulty very high, suggesting it was probably too much for its young target demographic. Electronic Gaming Monthly called it "a challenge for even the best of players", with puzzles "tricky" and "downright brutal" in the later sections. GamePro journalist Lawrence of Arcadia wrote that during instances where Rocko has to launch Spunky into the air, miscalculating can result in Spunky dying. Another major criticism was the controls, which were generally deemed difficult, unresponsive, and artificially increasing the difficulty. Reviewers cited examples of imprecise jumps, slippery walking, and the sporadically functional command for Rocko to pick up Spunky. Joe D. of GameFan, more positively, wrote that the controls only had a slight learning curve, although acknowledged that Rocko "seems to float a bit at first", and Elliot Fish of Hyper admitted to coming back repeatedly in spite of the learning curve with its controls. The small amount of stages was another source of disappointment.

The game's most praised aspect was its presentation. Critics admired how the game's visuals reflected the series' aesthetic, such as the cutscenes and characters, and the digitized voice clips. Fish and Lawrence of Arcadia highlighted the exaggerated movements, facial expressions, and look of the characters, and Joe D. noted its "bright colors, great artwork, good animation and nice multi-scrolling backgrounds". VideoGames and Computer Entertainment writer Zach Meston found the "colorful and disgustingly cute" graphics endearing, citing an animation where Spunky licks Rocko's face. However, he dismissed most of the sound effects and music as bland.

In a 2020 piece, Zack Zwiezen of Kotaku reported that the game's difficulty has led its reputation with players to wane in later years: "Reading comments on YouTube, you’ll find a lot of folks who remember this game and played it a lot in their youths, but it seems almost none of them ever beat it." Zwiezen sided with the majority, reasoning that it "isn't much fun and doesn't play well". He found trying to guide Spunky particularly annoying.
