= Daffy Duck: The Marvin Missions =

1993 video game

- North American SNES box art
- Developers: ICOM Simulations, Inc. (SNES); Sunsoft (GB)
- Publisher: Sunsoft
- Producer: Dave Marsh
- Designers: Brian Babendererde; Michael Garber; Karl Roelofs
- Composers: Super NES; Jim Hedges; Game Boy; Manami Matsumae
- Platforms: Super NES, Game Boy
- Release: Super NES: NA: October 1993; Game Boy: JP: September 30, 1994; NA: January 1995
- Genres: Platform, action
- Mode: Single-player

Daffy Duck: The Marvin Missions is a 1993 platform game for the Super NES. A different Game Boy game was released with the same title in North America, with the European Game Boy version known as Daffy Duck, and the Japanese Game Boy version is known as Looney Tunes Series: Daffy Duck (ルーニー・テューンズシリーズ ダフィー・ダック).

The game involves Duck Dodgers in the 24th and a ½ Century, as told in the classic Looney Tunes stories created by Chuck Jones. When he is hit, Duck Dodgers says some of Daffy Duck's lines from 1950s cartoons like "Mother", "Duck Dodgers!" and "Ho-hoo!", voiced by Greg Burson.

== Gameplay ==
In this boss fight, Duck Dodgers fights Marvin the Martian's army of Instant Martians (just add water) to save the politician in distress.

The Super NES version of Daffy Duck: The Marvin Missions starts out in the outskirts of a Martian resort and progresses to the remaining 19 stages.

Shrinking rays and crushing platforms are commonly seen as the player tries to kill Martians that are standing in the way along with rock monsters and dragons. Lava won't instantly kill the player's character but falling into a bottomless pit will. In the end, Marvin the Martian must be destroyed in the final stage of the game.

The game consists of five missions: "Where There's Duck There's Fire", where you must rescue three kidnapped politicians on Magma, "20,000 Martians Under The Sea", where you must destroy an Instant Martians (just add water) factory on Aquarion-4, "Duck Dodgers On Ice", where you must save Dr. I. Q. High from having his intelligence drained among the ice rings of Zeus-3, "The Incredible Shrinking Duck", where you must stop Marvin The Martian from shrinking Earth on Amazonius, and "The Greatest Show Off Earth", which sets you on Mars for the final showdown with the fate of Earth at stake.

Dodgers has infinite ammo for his starting gun and more guns with limited ammo can be found or bought throughout the game with the game's fictitious currency (which is depicted by the dollar sign). There are five types of guns: the regular gun, the three-shot gun, the electric gun, the bomb gun and the antimatter gun. Dodgers also has a jet pack so he can fly around to avoid danger on the ground and reach new locations, a shield to block incoming projectiles and a special attack called Nutty, which makes Duck Dodgers whirl around and destroy every enemy on the screen. However, Duck Dodgers has a tendency to bounce backwards whenever he fires a shot from any of his weapons.

In the Game Boy version, certain enemies were removed in the first and second levels. The Game Boy version includes a secret "hard" difficulty level. Losing in this difficulty level will simply reset the game instead of bringing up the game over screen.

== Reception ==
Reception

Aggregate score
Aggregator	Score
GameRankings	70.75% (SNES)

Review score
Publication	Score
Famitsu	6/10, 5/10, 5/10, 5/10 (GB)

Electronic Gaming Monthly gave the Super NES version a 7 out of 10, commenting that "The animations (just stand Daffy still) and voices are excellent, yet the control needs a bit of work—the jumps being particularly troublesome."

Electronic Gaming Monthly gave the Game Boy version a 4.75 out of 10, citing difficult jumps and repetitive boss fights, and further remarking that the Super Game Boy fails to significantly enhance the game. GamePro, however, called it "one of the best Game Boy carts of the season", applauding it for engaging design, excellent controls, impressive graphics, and "spacey" sound effects. Super Gamer gave the Game Boy version an overall score of 83/100 praising the visuals and animation and noting the games difficulty stating, "make no mistake, this game is very hard and rivals Mega Man and Bionic Commandos for challenge". Power Unlimited reviewed the SNES version and gave a score of 70% summarizing: "While Daffy Duck is a nice attempt at yet another platform game that you can play without much frustration and without having to think much, it is still not suitable for most gamers among us. Too easy."
