= MTV: Club Dead =

1994 video game

- Developer: Viacom New Media
- Publisher: Viacom New Media
- Platforms: MS-DOS, Classic Mac OS
- Release: 1994
- Genre: Adventure
- Mode: Single-player

MTV: Club Dead is a video game developed and published by Viacom New Media and released in 1994 for MS-DOS and Classic Mac OS. The game is an interactive adventure video game supported by full motion video cutscenes. The game was the first MTV-licensed CD-ROM, and aimed to merge live-action filmmaking with interactive media. Club Dead received mediocre reviews, with praise directed to the unique visual presentation and story, and critiques of its lack of interactivity and gameplay.

== Gameplay ==
Marketed as an "interactive movie", TClub Dead contains 150 live-action scenes filmed in full-motion video, totalling around 90 minutes of footage, and incorporates 3D pre-rendered graphics for gameplay elements. Live action-sequences are filmed with surrealistic camera angles and close-ups. Players are tasked with solving the game's mystery by uncovering clues. Navigating across 3D rooms, players are presented footage of interactions between the player and items, other characters or scenes depending on the in-game time. Players must be in the right location at the right in-game time to view these sequences, and can miss important scenes.

== Plot ==
Set in the year 2024, Club Dead takes place in Alexandria, a floating resort over the Arctic operated by Metacorp. The player is Sam Frost, a virtual reality addict undergoing withdrawal symptoms, including hallucinations, from exposure to cyberspace. Sam is a cyber-plumber smuggled out of prison by Metacorp and tasked with uncovering the reason behind why their visitors are mysteriously dying in the resort's virtual reality chambers. Framed for the murders, Sam has four days to uncover the truth and hunt down the real killer.

== Development ==
Club Dead was developed by Viacom New Media, a subsidiary formed when Illinois studio ICOM Simulations merged with the company to produce interactive media. The game was conceived as the first MTV-licensed CD-ROM title alongside Beavis and Butt-Head, also created by Viacom. The game's director, Greg Harrison, described the title as a "total melding of live-action filmmaking and digital imaging". The 3D animations were created with the assistance of the Chicago studio H-Gun Labs. Club Dead featured several notable actors, including Kate Walsh, Nick Offerman, and Pat Healy in his first onscreen role. Thematically, the game intentionally shares similarities with the MTV show Dead at 21, including its story, direction and visuals. The game was showcased at the Chicago Consumer Electronic Show in 1994.

== Reception ==
Reception

Review scores
Publication	Score
CD-ROM Today	3.5/5
Flux	B

Connor Freff Cochran of Interactivity commended the game for its "good storytelling" and "solidly professional direction and editing", consistent with the fast-paced visual style of the MTV brand. Cochran praised the game's "single, unifying eesthetic", citing its visual influences drawing from German expressionism and cyberpunk. Garrick Webster of CD-ROM Today described the game as a "light-hearted, self-lampooning mystery game", mentioning that it "combines pace and peculiarity quite well" due to its music, character interactions and style. Lance Ulanoff of PC Magazine listed the game as one of its Top 100 CD-ROMs in 1995, saying "the story is compelling, the mystery difficult to crack, and the characters oddball and developed enough to keep you playing". Steve Honeywell of Cinescape considered the gameplay to "fall short" and the imagery to be "rapid-fire incoherent", but praised the video quality as "very good". Dan Amrich of Flux considered Club Dead to be a "captivating adventure game", but found the story "confusing" and "intentionally weird".
