= Zoop =

1995 video game

- Developers: Hookstone; PanelComp (SNES, Genesis); Electric Spectacle Productions (Jaguar)
- Publishers: Viacom New Media; Atari Corporation (Jaguar); Media Quest (PS, Saturn); Yanoman (Game Boy)
- Director: Jim Hanson
- Producer: I. Kenneth Miller
- Designer: Jason McGann
- Programmer: John Rocke
- Artists: Ian J. Bowden; Malcolm Cooper; Peter Tattersall
- Composers: Bob Scumaci; Mark Davis; Brian L. Schmidt
- Platforms: Genesis/Mega Drive, Game Boy, Game Gear, Mac OS, MS-DOS, PlayStation, Sega Saturn, Super NES, Atari Jaguar
- Release: 9 October 1995: Genesis; NA: 9 October 1995; EU: 28 November 1995 Super NES; NA: 9 October 1995; EU: 28 November 1995 MS-DOS; NA: 9 October 1995; EU: 28 November 1995 Macintosh; NA: 9 October 1995; EU: 28 November 1995 PlayStation; NA: 20 November 1995; JP: 22 November 1996 Game Boy; NA: 5 November 1995; EU: 28 November 1995; JP: 31 January 1997 Game Gear; NA: 1995 Jaguar; NA: 5 January 1996; EU: 5 January 1996 Saturn; JP: 29 November 1996
- Genre: Puzzle
- Modes: Single-player, multiplayer (Game Boy)

Zoop is a puzzle video game originally developed by Hookstone and published by Viacom New Media in 1995 for the Sega Genesis, Super Nintendo Entertainment System, MS-DOS, Macintosh, PlayStation, Game Gear, and Game Boy, then in 1996 for the Saturn and Jaguar. Zoop has similarities to Taito's 1989 arcade video game Plotting (also known as Flipull), but Zoop runs in real-time instead. Players are tasked with eliminating pieces that spawn from one of the sides of the screen before they reach the center of the playfield. By pointing at a piece and shooting it, the player can either swap it with the current player color and thus arrange the same color pieces in a row or column, or match the color.

A month before release, Zoop was one of four games played in the preliminary rounds of the Blockbuster World Video Game Championship II competition, a rare instance of an as-yet-unreleased game being used in a video game competition.

== Gameplay ==
The fourth stage (Genesis)

Zoop is a real-time puzzle game, like Plotting, in which the player controls a triangle in the center of the screen. Every second (or more often in advanced levels), a piece comes in from the side and possibly pushes other pieces forward. Two consecutive pieces will never come in from the same quadrant, and runs of consecutive identical pieces on one row are longer, statistically, than one might expect. If a piece falls into the center square, the game is over.

If the player shoots a piece of the same color as their triangle, it will be "zooped" (cleared) and points are earned. If the piece behind the target piece is also of the same color, it is also "zooped". The same goes for the next piece, and so on. If a piece of a different color from the player's current piece is shot, the player's piece will switch colors with it. This is also what happens when a piece of a different color is encountered after zooping one or more pieces of the same color. When the quota of "zooped" pieces is met, the game speeds up, and (before level 10) the background changes. Various special pieces do different things, such as a proximity bomb (shaped like a lightning bolt) that blows up pieces in a 3×3 area centered at the target piece, or a line bomb (often shaped like a gear) that clears a whole target line of pieces.

To make gameplay more difficult, the game also employed what was referred to as "Opti-Challenge" backgrounds. As the levels progressed, the backgrounds would become increasingly distracting. Early on, this would involve the use of contrasting colors and increasingly intricate color schemes. Background patterns would also become more intricate and would make subtle use of asymmetrical elements. Although the "Opti-Challenge" technique of the game was used as a selling point, very little information exists about the technique itself, and no other game on the market has ever claimed to use "Opti-Challenge" graphics. The sound effects have a cartoonish tone to match the vivid colors used through the stages, while the music is smooth jazz and "evolves" with the game. As the levels get harder, the music becomes more tense, adding to the fast-paced atmosphere of the game.

== Development and release ==
Along with Dracula Unleashed, Zoop is one of the few original properties that were released by Viacom New Media, who only published games that are based on existing intellectual properties (including Viacom Media Networks' programming) until their closure in 1997. The title was extensively marketed by Viacom, who wanted the game to replicate the level of success of Tetris, which can be evidenced by its release on many platforms, as well as the game's slogan, "America's Largest Killer of Time!".

The team at Hookstone stated in an interview with Spanish magazine PC Manía that Zoop spent several years in development and that the concept proved to be difficult to explain to their producers and as such, the team presented a nearly-finished build. The PC was chosen as the lead platform, despite the development team never having done anything for the PC before. According to Aaron Fothergill, one of the programmers for the Atari Jaguar version of Zoop, Electric Spectacle Productions wanted the Jaguar version to have more advanced visuals than the PlayStation version, but Viacom requested the developer to disable the extra graphics to make the PlayStation version more appealing than the Jaguar version. As of 2018, the rights to Zoop are held by Viacom International.

Before it was officially released to the general public, the game was featured and played during the preliminary rounds on the Blockbuster World Video Game Championship II competition. Shortly after its release, the Super NES version was offered as part of a limited "rent one, get one free" promotion by Blockbuster.

== Ports ==
The Genesis and Super NES versions of Zoop are identical in terms of gameplay, aside from graphical and audio differences between the two. The MS-DOS version of the game has support for various sound cards, and it uses wavetable-like MIDI music. The PlayStation version was released a month after the system was launched and has more advanced visuals. The Game Boy port is the only version across all platforms that features a multiplayer mode. It also received a port to the Atari Jaguar that was developed by Electric Spectacle Productions and published by Atari Corporation on 5 January 1996, with graphics that are more in line with the previously released versions but sporting a more jazz-style soundtrack. It was one of the last releases for the Jaguar. Zoop was also released for the Sega Saturn in Japan only by Media Quest on 29 November 1996. The Saturn version uses the same enhanced visuals as the PlayStation port.

== Reception ==
Reception

Review scores
Publication	Score						
Publication	Atari Jaguar	DOS	Game Gear	PS	Saturn	Sega Genesis	SNES
AllGame	N/A	N/A	N/A	4.5/5	N/A	3/5	4/5
Electronic Gaming Monthly	N/A	N/A	5.875 / 10	N/A	N/A	N/A	N/A
Famitsu	N/A	N/A	N/A	N/A	6/10, 6/10, 5/10, 6/10	N/A	N/A
Game Informer	N/A	N/A	N/A	N/A	N/A	N/A	8.0 / 10
Game Players	N/A	N/A	N/A	N/A	N/A	N/A	74%
GameFan	N/A	N/A	N/A	263 / 300	N/A	N/A	N/A
GameSpot	N/A	7.0 / 10	N/A	N/A	N/A	N/A	N/A
IGN	N/A	N/A	N/A	5.0 / 10	N/A	N/A	N/A
Next Generation	3/5	N/A	N/A	3/5	N/A	N/A	2/5
Nintendo Power	N/A	N/A	N/A	N/A	N/A	N/A	12.7 / 20
CGR	N/A	263 / 300	N/A	N/A	N/A	N/A	N/A
EW	N/A	A-	N/A	N/A	N/A	N/A	N/A
Mean Machines Sega	N/A	N/A	N/A	N/A	N/A	63 / 100	N/A
Micromanía	N/A	92%	N/A	N/A	N/A	4/5	N/A
Sega Pro	N/A	N/A	N/A	N/A	N/A	85 / 100	N/A
SSM	N/A	N/A	N/A	N/A	N/A	62%	N/A
UFG	N/A	68%	N/A	N/A	N/A	N/A	N/A
VideoGames	N/A	N/A	N/A	N/A	N/A	N/A	7 / 10

Awards
Publication	Award
Nintendo Power (1995)	Best Puzzle Game
Power Play (1995)	Biggest Hype in 1995

The four reviewers of Electronic Gaming Monthly criticized the Game Gear version as having poor audio even by Game Gear standards but otherwise were divided about the game. One of them said "it is more like work than anything else, and it certainly isn't addictive", two of them said it lacks anything special but is still addictive and enjoyable for players of all skill levels, and the fourth called it "a must-try".

Reviewing the SNES version, a critic for Next Generation found the gameplay to be too complicated, concluding that "it's not bad really, but the idea isn't that intuitive, and once you get past the learning curve it lacks the addictive quality this kind of game needs." GamePro's The Axe Grinder similarly said that, while the game is fun and has good graphics and music, it lacks the addictive pull that an action puzzler needs to distinguish itself.

Sega Saturn Magazine (previously Sega Magazine) gave the Genesis/Mega Drive version a 62%, saying the game "has the curious compulsiveness of Tetris to a degree", but that it is overshadowed by more complex and graphically impressive games then on the market. Cover Girl of GamePro was pleased with the music and graphics, particularly the use of eye-tricking background contrasts in the later levels. She found the level select and five difficulty modes broaden the accessibility, but criticized that the game sends the player back to the beginning whenever they lose. She concluded that while falling short of classics like Tetris, Zoop is an enjoyable enough puzzler to merit a buy.

Reviewing the Jaguar version, GamePro noted that it made no changes from previous versions of the game. They said of the game itself: "A classic? No. Addictive? Yes." Next Generation similarly stated that "while Zoop is an enjoyable game, it's not exactly the second puzzling. ... Games like Tetris and Bust-a-Move have undeniable magic, and while Zoop has the mechanics of a great puzzle game, it lacks that magic." They praised the pace of the action, in that the game demands the player's full attention from the beginning.

GamePro's brief review of the PlayStation version called it "an uncomplicated puzzle game that's only slightly hampered by squirrelly controls" and "a great addiction for puzzle fans." A brief review from Next Generation commented, "Action puzzle games should be simple but addicting; Zoop is complicated but kind of compulsive." IGN rated the PlayStation version of the game a 5/10, stating, "Zoop has all the makings of a good puzzle game, it just doesn't deliver the goods."

Entertainment Weekly gave the DOS version an A− and said it wasn't as addictive but was as much fun as Tetris.

The game was awarded "Best Puzzle Game" in the 1995 Nintendo Power Awards.

== Legacy ==
The game was featured in 1995 in series 5 episode 4 of the British TV series GamesMaster.

In September 2003, the trademark renewal for Zoop was cancelled.
