= Shadowgate 64: Trials of the Four Towers =

1999 video game

Shadowgate 64
- North American box art
- Developers: TNS Co., Ltd. Infinite Ventures
- Publisher: Kemco
- Composers: Saori Kobayashi; Kennosuke Suemura
- Platform: Nintendo 64
- Release: NA: June 9, 1999; UK: July 30, 1999
- Genre: Adventure
- Mode: Single-player

Shadowgate 64: Trials of the Four Towers, also known simply as Shadowgate 64, is a 1999 adventure game developed by TNS Co., Ltd. and Infinite Ventures and published by Kemco for Nintendo 64. It is a sequel to the original Shadowgate.

== Gameplay ==
A screenshot of Shadowgate 64: Trials of the Four Towers gameplay.

Shadowgate 64 has the same first-person view of the first game, though this time the static screens of the original were replaced by full 3D roaming similar to that of first-person shooters. Despite the graphical changes, the core game is similar: the game relies mostly on solving puzzles and riddles rather than fighting enemies. The warden and dwarf-like guards are the only enemies to be found, and they have to be avoided. There are many instances in which Del can die, such as a fall from a moderate height or dropping into deep water. The player must find ways around everything through interaction with the environment.

Unlike the extensive menu-based actions of the first game, Shadowgate 64 simplifies most of these actions down to two buttons: one acts as a generic action command, while the other serves to use items.

== Plot ==
The game takes place centuries after the first Shadowgate where Lord Jair defeated Warlock, and claimed his position to the throne. However, as the time passed the kingdom started rotting into a gathering for thieves, bandits and other evil beings. The player takes the role of the mostly unseen Del Cottonwood, a halfling who traveled in a caravan but was imprisoned by the bandits when crossing Shadowgate while his traveling partners were murdered.

While in prison, Del finds a way to break free and embark on a quest that takes him through the Four Towers. Each one contains a different task Del must complete to proceed. Del utilizes books and the help of ghosts of deceased town members to learn the story of Shadowgate. Between his trials of the towers, Del explores the bleak and desolate castle town. Doing odd-jobs for the few villagers left, Del gains access to other towers and new areas; he even is offered a way out of the castle walls, but declines.

Eventually, Del learns from Lakmir that Belzar, one of Lakmir's students, is trying to resurrect the Warlock Lord. Belzar believes he has found the legendary Staff of Ages, but what he has found is in fact the uncontrollable Staff of Thunder. Through the trial of the four towers, Del manages to get his hands on the real Staff of Ages, and uses a Dragon's Eye to activate the Staff of Thunder in an attempt to foil the Warlock Lord's resurrection. The plan is only partly successful, killing Belzar and destroying most of Shadowgate, but the evil sorcerer is still revived. Using the Staff of Ages, Del is able to invoke Jair's spirit to strike the final blow to the evil sorcerer and destroy him once and for all. Afterwards, Del is whisked away on a dragon's back towards new adventures.

== Development ==
The game was designed by Infinite Ventures and the original NES development team.

== Reception ==
Reception

Aggregate score
Aggregator	Score
GameRankings	61%

Review scores
Publication	Score
GameSpot	4.6/10
IGN	6.2/10
N64 Magazine	43%
Next Generation	2/5

Shadowgate 64 received mixed reviews from critics. N64 Magazine called the game very dull and frustrating because it has many instances of instant death situations, but still praised its atmosphere. Next Generation stated: "Nothing especially wrong here, but nothing you haven't seen done before (and better)".

== Legacy ==
Shadowgate Rising was an adventure game developed by Infinite Ventures for the Nintendo 64 but was never released. Originally intended to be a sequel to Shadowgate 64: Trials of the Four Towers, the project was abandoned because the Nintendo 64 was soon to be replaced by the GameCube.
