= Shadowgate =

1987 video game

- Apple IIGS box art
- Developer: ICOM Simulations (Note: NES version developed by Kemco; Game Boy Color version developed by Infinite Ventures.)
- Publishers: Mindscape: NES; NA: Kemco * Seika; JP/PAL: Kemco Game Boy Color; NA/EU: Nintendo; JP: Kemco Mobile Vindigo Entertainment
- Directors: Dave Marsh; Karl Roelofs
- Composers: NES; Hiroyuki Masuno; Kento's Group
- Series: Shadowgate
- Engine: MacVenture
- Platform: Macintosh: Amiga, Atari ST, MS-DOS, NES, Apple IIGS, Windows, Game Boy Color, Pocket PC, Palm OS, mobile phone, Playdate
- Release: June 1987: Macintosh; NA: June 1987; Amiga; NA: December 1987; Atari ST; NA: February 1988; MS-DOS; NA: July 1988; NES; JP: March 31, 1989; NA: December 1989; PAL: May 30, 1991; Apple IIGS; NA: 1989; Windows; NA: 1993; EU: 1993; Game Boy Color; NA: January 1999; JP: August 13, 1999; Pocket PC; NA: 2002; Playdate; WW: June 18, 2025
- Genre: Point-and-click adventure
- Mode: Single-player

Shadowgate is a 1987 point-and-click adventure game developed by ICOM Simulations and published by Mindscape for the Macintosh as part of the MacVenture series. The game takes place in the Castle Shadowgate, residence of the evil Warlock Lord. The player, as the "last of a great line of hero-kings", is tasked with saving the world by defeating the Warlock Lord, who is attempting to summon the demon Behemoth out of Hell. The original Macintosh version was only in black-and-white, but color versions of the game were later released for the Amiga and Atari ST, and in 1989 for the Nintendo Entertainment System. The game was generally well-received, and was followed by several sequels and remakes for various systems.

== Gameplay ==
The beginning of the game (Macintosh version)

Shadowgate is a point-and-click adventure game in which the player must solve a series of puzzles throughout a castle to proceed to the Warlock Lord's chamber. Due to the castle's perilous nature, at least one lit torch must be in the player's possession at all times. If all torches are extinguished, the player soon stumbles, breaking their neck, and must then continue from a saved game (or the area where they died, in console versions). Only a limited number of torches can be found throughout the game, which effectively acts as a time limit. The player may acquire various items such as a sword, a sling and other ancient weapons which can be used at the appropriate time to deliver a fatal blow to specific enemies.

The game has many instances of death, including being burned by dragon's breath, attacked by a cyclops, sucked into outer space through a broken mirror, dissolved by acidic slime, eaten by sharks, mauled by a wolf-woman, and suicide. Virtually any action taken by the player which is not the correct solution to a puzzle will result in a fatality. These deaths are often graphically described in the game's text (along with frequent sardonic and humorous comments), even in the NES version (in spite of Nintendo's policy of censorship at the time). Many of the game's puzzles rely on a system of trial and error, requiring the player to frequently save their game to avoid losing progress. Subtle hints can be found in books and the descriptive game texts. In the NES version, these are replaced by a hint feature which gives vague clues about what is noteworthy in any given room.

== Plot ==
Shadowgate begins as the protagonist finds himself standing at the entry to the Castle Shadowgate, remembering that he had been tasked by the wizard Lakmir with defeating the evil Warlock Lord before he can raise the Behemoth from the depths and destroy the world.

The protagonist then enters Castle Shadowgate and begins to solve its puzzles, while surviving its many traps and defeating various monsters along the way. During the journey, he collects three sacred artifacts which together form the Staff of Ages, a holy weapon capable of stopping the Warlock Lord once and for all.

The protagonist eventually enters the Warlock Lord's chamber just as he succeeds in opening the gates of Hell and summoning the Behemoth. The protagonist assembles the Staff and uses it to mortally wound the Behemoth. As it dies, the Behemoth then drags the Warlock Lord with him into Hell. The protagonist returns victorious, where he is betrothed to the King's daughter and entitled High Lord of the Westland.

== Ports ==
Shadowgate was originally released for Macintosh in 1987 and ported to other computers, including a color version for the Amiga later the same year. It was released for the Atari ST and MS-DOS in 1988, and for the Apple IIGS in 1989. It made its first console appearance later that year for the Nintendo Entertainment System. The success of Shadowgate on the NES prompted ICOM Simulations to have Kemco port the other MacVenture titles to the console, including Déjà Vu and Uninvited. The NES version of Shadowgate is one of the few NES games with a Swedish language version. In 1992, an enhanced version of the game was released for Windows 3.1x.

The NES port was re-released in October 2017 (alongside Déjà Vu and Uninvited) for Microsoft Windows, Xbox One, and PlayStation 4 in a collection called 8-Bit Adventure Anthology: Volume 1, developed by Abstraction Games.

In 2024, a port for the Playdate handheld console was announced. This port, titled Shadowgate PD, was released as part of the Season 2 pack on June 18, 2025.

== Reception ==
Reception

Aggregate score
| Aggregator | Score |
|---|---|
| GameRankings | 67.14% (GBC) |

Review scores
| Publication | Score |
|---|---|
| AllGame | 4 out of 5 (PC); 3 out of 5 (MAC); 4.5 out of 5 (NES); 2.5 out of 5 (GBC, Pocket PC) |
| GameSpot | 5.8 out of 10 (GBC) |
| IGN | 6 out of 10 (GBC) |
| Nintendo Power | 7.3 out of 10 (GBC) |

Computer Gaming World gave the game a very positive review, noting the game uses the same superior interface as prior MacVenture games. The difficulty was noted as a step up from Deja Vu and Uninvited, but Shadowgate was also said to be more flexible, allowing more than one solution to some puzzles.

The game was reviewed in 1987 in Dragon #128 by Hartley, Patricia, and Kirk Lesser in "The Role of Computers" column. The reviewers stated "Shadowgate is a great adventure game in that you must continually be aware of what’s already been accomplished to complete subsequent puzzles". The reviewers gave the game 5/5 stars.

Keith McCandless of Macworld reviewed the Macintosh version of Shadowgate, praising its extensive gameplay, stating "so much is jammed into these two disks that nearly everyone should find this game appealing ... ShadowGate plays easily and instinctively". McCandless also praised Shadowgate's graphics and sound, calling the graphics "expertly crafted", despite "[lacking] originality", and called the sound effects "far better than those of most adventure games". He further called Shadowgate "technically, visually, and aurally superior to most of its competition", but criticized the game's mood, stating that it doesn't "take itself seriously enough to create a mood of mystery", and also lacks the 'tongue-in-cheek' humor of other adventure games, creating a feeling of something "lacking".

== Legacy ==
Release timeline
| 1987 | Shadowgate |
1988–1992
| 1993 | Beyond Shadowgate |
1994–1998
| 1999 | Shadowgate Classic GBC |
| 1999 | Shadowgate 64: Trials of the Four Towers |
2000–2004
| 2005 | Shadowgate Classic |
2006–2013
| 2014 | Shadowgate |
2015–2020
| 2021 | Shadowgate VR: The Mines of Mythrok |
2022–2023
| 2024 | Beyond Shadowgate (2024) |
| 2025 | Shadowgate II |
| 2025 | Shadowgate PD |

In 1996, Infinite Ventures acquired from Viacom the rights to Shadowgate and other games originally developed by ICOM Simulations. ICOM Simulations had been acquired by Viacom in 1994, but had published no updates to the original products. After the acquisition, Infinite Ventures ported the game to other operating systems such as Windows 9x, as well as portable systems including Windows CE and Palm OS, under the name of Shadowgate Classic. These versions had a new interface and menu layout, with artwork based on the 1996 Windows versions.

In 1999, Infinite Ventures licensed the NES version of Shadowgate to Kemco. This version was ported to the Game Boy Color with enhanced sprites and animations; it also used the Shadowgate Classic name.

In 2005, a mobile phone version of the game was released by Vindigo Entertainment. Once again using the name of Shadowgate Classic, this version featured new graphics, puzzles, challenges, and areas.

In 2006, Infinite Ventures licensed the rights to the ICOM Simulations portfolio to Zojoi, LLC, a company formed by Shadowgate's original game designers, Dave Marsh and Karl Roelofs. In October 2012, Zojoi launched a Kickstarter campaign to secure funding for a remake of Shadowgate. Original game creators Dave Marsh and Karl Roelofs appeared in the pitch video and showed pre-production footage of the game in development. They set a crowd-funding goal of $120,000. In the second update of the Kickstarter campaign, the Black Axe, an item and quest that had been cut from the original game due to size constraints, was announced to be reintroduced in the new version of Shadowgate. Those who pledged $2,500 or more received a replica Staff of Ages. The campaign finished successfully, earning $137,232 in pledges by November 2012 and reaching its first stretch goal. The remake was completed and released for Windows in 2014. In 2019, it was ported to the PlayStation 4, Xbox One and Nintendo Switch.

=== Sequels ===
In 1991, a novel written under the pen name "F.X. Nine" called Before Shadowgate was published by Scholastic Corporation as part of the Worlds of Power series of video game novelizations of third party Nintendo Entertainment System games. The novel acts as a prequel to the game, and featured contributions from Shadowgate co-creators Dave Marsh and Karl Roelofs, who provided important details and information to the book's author.

There have been two sequels to the game. The first, Beyond Shadowgate, was released for the TurboGrafx-16 in 1993 and the second, Shadowgate 64: Trials of the Four Towers, for the Nintendo 64 in 1999. Another N64 sequel, Shadowgate Rising, was well into development, but the project was scrapped when Nintendo announced a new console which became the GameCube.

On September 16, 2021, 317 Games launched a Kickstarter crowdfunding campaign for Shadowgate, The Living Castle, a board game based on the Shadowgate series.

In October 2021, Zojoi and Azure Drop Studios released Shadowgate VR: The Mines of Mythrok, an exclusive Oculus Quest title which was ported to other VR consoles in 2025.

On January 22, 2023, Zojoi announced a Kickstarter crowdfunding campaign for Beyond Shadowgate, an official sequel to the NES version of Shadowgate. A video from series co-creator Dave Marsh notes this project uses the original design documents from 1990, and is unrelated to the TurboGrafx-16 game. It was released on Steam and GOG on September 19, 2024.
