= Beavis and Butt-Head in Virtual Stupidity =

1995 video game

- North American cover art
- Developer: ICOM Simulations
- Publisher: Viacom New Media JP: B-Factory
- Producer: Cathi Court
- Designers: Brian Babendererde; Brad Delaney
- Programmer: Christian Gustafsson
- Artists: Brian Babendererde; Alisa E. Kober
- Series: Beavis and Butt-Head
- Platforms: Windows, PlayStation
- Release: Windows: NA: November 1995; EU: 1996; PlayStation: JP: January 29, 1998
- Genre: Adventure
- Mode: Single-player

Beavis and Butt-Head in Virtual Stupidity is a point-and-click adventure video game developed by ICOM Simulations and published by Viacom New Media for Windows. It is based on Beavis and Butt-Head, an American animated television series created by Mike Judge for MTV.

It featured vocals from the series' cast of voice actors, including Mike Judge. Besides the main game, four mini-games are featured, called Hock-A-Loogie, Court Chaos, Bug Justice, and Air Guitar.

The main game plots the two main characters, Beavis and Butt-Head, trying to get into Todd's gang. Over the course of the game, they have to complete tasks and explore areas in the fictional town of Highland, Texas.

A CD-i port of Virtual Stupidity was planned but was cancelled due to falling sales of the console. A PlayStation port was released exclusively in Japan in 1998 with dubbed voice acting by Owarai duo London Boots Ichi-gō Ni-gō.

== Plot ==
The game starts with Beavis and Butt-Head working at Burger World. They are met by Todd, who threatens them. Despite this, Beavis and Butt-Head worship Todd because of how tough he is and consider him "cool." They decide to try to join Todd's gang.

At Highland High, the duo are forced to stay in Science Class and dissect a frog. Eventually, they manage to skip class after lying to the science teacher that they are going to the bathroom. They manage to slip from school after spitting on Principal McVicker from the school rooftop, causing him to unlock and open the school's front door.

From then on, Beavis and Butt-Head explore various areas from Highland, including their house, Burger World, the park, and Maxi-Mart, completing various tasks, in order to get closer to Todd and his gang.

After a series of events including driving a military-grade tank, escaping from prison, defeating Todd's rivals and retrieving Todd's car, Beavis and Butt-Head are trapped in the car's trunk by girls. After being rescued by Daria Morgendorffer, they drive the car back to their house, where Todd is waiting. He briefly accepts the duo into his gang, but the police arrive and Beavis inadvertently gets Todd arrested, leaving Beavis and Butt-Head at home where they return to their usual routine of watching television.

== Music videos ==
Three full-length music videos (with added commentary by Beavis and Butt-Head) are viewable on various television sets in the game:

1. Gwar – "Saddam a Go-Go"
2. Primus – "DMV"
3. Sausage – "Riddles Are Abound Tonight"

== Reception ==
Reception

Review scores
Publication	Score
PC Gamer (US)	90%
Next Generation	4/5
Computer Games Strategy Plus	4/5
Computer Game Review	85/65/78
PC Entertainment	C

Award
Publication	Award
PC Gamer US	Best Adventure Game 1995

According to senior artist Tom Zehner, Virtual Stupidity achieved sales above 100,000 units. The game was a commercial success.

Virtual Stupidity received mostly positive reviews from video game magazines and websites. It held a 76.86% average at GameRankings based on seven reviews. Reviewing the PC version, a reviewer for Next Generation said it "may be one of the funniest games to ever hit store shelves." He applauded the game for "flawlessly" recreating the look, sound, and humor of the TV show while having enough strong gameplay to make it stand on its own as an outstanding adventure game. He scored it 4 out of 5 stars.

PC Gamer US named Virtual Stupidity the best adventure game of 1995. The editors wrote, "This game is a textbook example of the right way to bring material from another medium to PC gaming." In 1998, the magazine declared it the 24th-best computer game ever released, and the editors called it "a great piece of adventure gaming".
