= Zojoi =

American video game development company

- Company type: Limited Liability Company
- Industry: Software; video games
- Founded: Charlottesville, Virginia (March 7, 2012)
- Founder: David Marsh
- Headquarters: Charlottesville, Virginia, United States
- Key people: David Marsh; Karl Roelofs
- Products: Sherlock Holmes: Consulting Detective
- Website: zojoi.com

Zojoi is a video game software development company based in Charlottesville, Virginia. It was founded by former ICOM Simulations developers David Marsh and Karl Roelofs in 2012. Zojoi currently has the rights to many of the intellectual properties that once belonged to ICOM Simulations, including Sherlock Holmes: Consulting Detective and Shadowgate.

== History ==
Zojoi was established on March 7, 2012, with the Commonwealth of Virginia State Corporation Commission. The company is led by former ICOM Simulations developers David Marsh and Karl Roelofs who worked on the MacVenture series of games and created Shadowgate. Zojoi's website states that the company is devoted to bringing the original games of ICOM Simulations' intellectual properties to many gaming platforms, as well as new games based on the original IPs.

Zojois first game releases were the first three Sherlock Holmes: Consulting Detective mysteries on iOS, PC, and Mac. In August 2014 the company released a new and enhanced version of Shadowgate for iOS, Android, PC, and Mac devices In an interview with GameSpot during the production process, David Marsh said that Shadowgate would include new rooms and puzzles and a user friendly interface for accessing the player's inventory and a map for navigating around Castle Shadowgate.

== Games ==
Game	Details
Sherlock Holmes Consulting Detective: Case 1 - The Case of the Mummy's Curse Original release dates: NA: September 18, 2012 (iTunes); NA: October 7, 2012 (Desura); WW: June 8, 2015 (Steam)	Release years by system: 2012 – iPad 2 / The new iPad; 2012 – OS X; 2012 – Microsoft Windows
Sherlock Holmes Consulting Detective: Case 1 - The Case of the Mummy's Curse Original release dates: NA: September 18, 2012 (iTunes); NA: October 7, 2012 (Desura); WW: June 8, 2015 (Steam)	Notes: The Microsoft Windows and OS X versions were initially distributed using Desura before being added to Steam after the bankruptcy of Desura
Sherlock Holmes Consulting Detective: Case 2 - The Case of the Tin Soldier Original release dates: NA: September 18, 2012 (iTunes); NA: October 7, 2012 (Desura); WW: June 8, 2015 (Steam)	Release years by system: 2012 – iPad 2 / The new iPad; 2012 – OS X; 2012 – Microsoft Windows
Sherlock Holmes Consulting Detective: Case 2 - The Case of the Tin Soldier Original release dates: NA: September 18, 2012 (iTunes); NA: October 7, 2012 (Desura); WW: June 8, 2015 (Steam)	Notes: The Microsoft Windows and OS X versions were initially distributed using Desura before being added to Steam after the bankruptcy of Desura
Sherlock Holmes Consulting Detective: Case 3 - The Case of the Mystified Murderess Original release dates: NA: September 18, 2012 (iTunes); NA: October 7, 2012 (Desura); WW: June 8, 2015 (Steam)	Release years by system: 2012 – iPad 2 / The new iPad; 2012 – OS X; 2012 – Microsoft Windows
Sherlock Holmes Consulting Detective: Case 3 - The Case of the Mystified Murderess Original release dates: NA: September 18, 2012 (iTunes); NA: October 7, 2012 (Desura); WW: June 8, 2015 (Steam)	Notes: The Microsoft Windows and OS X versions were initially distributed on Desura before being added to Steam after the bankruptcy of Desura
Shadowgate Original release date(s): WW: August 21, 2014; (Steam)	Release years by system: October 22, 2015 - iOS; December 18, 2015 - Android; August 21, 2014 - Microsoft Windows; August 21, 2014 - Mac OS X; March 17, 2015 - Linux; April 11, 2019 - Nintendo Switch
Shadowgate Original release date(s): WW: August 21, 2014; (Steam)	Notes: Would be the latest entry in the MacVenture series of first-person graphic adventure games.; The Microsoft Windows, OS X and Linux versions are distributed on Steam; The Android version would later be removed from both Google Play and Amazon Appstore.
Argonus and the Gods of Stone Original release date(s): WW: October 8, 2019; (Steam)	Release years by system: October 8, 2019 - Microsoft Windows
Argonus and the Gods of Stone Original release date(s): WW: October 8, 2019; (Steam)	Notes: Distributed on Steam
Shadowgate VR: The Mines of Mythrok Original release dates: WW: October 8, 2021 (Oculus Quest); WW: June 18, 2022 (Steam)	Release years by system: October 8, 2021 - Oculus Quest; June 18, 2022 - Steam VR
Shadowgate VR: The Mines of Mythrok Original release dates: WW: October 8, 2021 (Oculus Quest); WW: June 18, 2022 (Steam)	Notes: Initially exclusive to Oculus Quest before being distributed on Steam
Beyond Shadowgate Original release date(s): WW: September 19, 2024; (Steam)	Release years by system: September 19, 2024 - Microsoft Windows
Beyond Shadowgate Original release date(s): WW: September 19, 2024; (Steam)	Notes: Distributed on Steam and GOG.com
