= MacVenture =

Video game series

MacVenture is a series of four adventure games with a menu-based point-and-click interface. They were originally developed for the Macintosh by ICOM Simulations:

1. Déjà Vu (1985)
2. Uninvited (1986)
3. Shadowgate (1987)
4. Deja Vu II: Lost in Las Vegas (1988)

All four games were later released for other platforms including Amiga, Apple IIGS, Atari ST, Commodore 64, IBM PC compatibles, Pocket PC, and Nintendo Entertainment System.

== History ==
The MacVenture engine was written in 1985 for the first game in the series, Déjà Vu. Making the entire game fit together with system software on two 400 k single-sided floppy disks proved to be quite a challenge and special image compression routines had to be written to accomplish this.

A handful of sequels such as Beyond Shadowgate and Shadowgate 64 were later made and only the background story was in common with the MacVenture games. The rights to the MacVentures are currently maintained by Zojoi.

The "MacVenture" name was used in loading screens and about boxes – in the original releases for other platforms it was translated, e.g. "Atari Venture" or "PC Venture". MacVenture is the only of these used for referring to the game series in other contexts.

== Developers ==
The MacVenture team had the following contributors to all four titles:

- Tod Zipnick
- Darin Adler (primary developer)
- Steve Hays
- Waldemar Horwat
- Dave Marsh (graphics)
- Terry Schulenburg (as "Schulenberg" in Déjà Vu)
- Todd Squires
- Jay Zipnick

The following people had part in the development of some of the games, as noted:

- Mitch Adler (Déjà Vu II)
- Fred Allen (Déjà Vu II)
- Brian Baker (Déjà Vu II)
- Scott Berfield (producer/designer: Uninvited, producer: Déjà Vu, Shadowgate)
- Ed Dluzen (Déjà Vu II)
- Craig Erickson (Déjà Vu, Uninvited)
- Dave Feldman (Uninvited, Shadowgate, Déjà Vu II)
- Michael Manning (Déjà Vu II)
- Kurt Nelson (Déjà Vu)
- Karl Roelofs (graphics: Shadowgate, Déjà Vu II)
- Paul Snively (Déjà Vu II)
- Julia Ulano (Déjà Vu II)
- Mark Waterman (Déjà Vu, Uninvited)
- Billy Wolfe (Uninvited)

== Features ==
The game interface is laid out in a novel "desktop" style where objects are taken from the environment and added to the player's possessions by dragging and dropping them into the "inventory". There are also standard menu commands like "Save as...". Multiple objects can be selected and used at the same time by shift-clicking, and there is even a "Clean up" command which sorts out the inventory in the same way as the Finder (unlike the Finder, there is also a "Mess up" command). Much like any non-game application, the various game windows can be rearranged according to taste and the font of the text window can be changed as well. The MacVenture games use the Macintosh's built in widget toolkit for the user interface which adds to the feeling of the game as a regular application.

Unlike Sierra or LucasArts' classic adventure games, MacVentures are played in first-person perspective. The player's current view is displayed in a graphic window accompanied by a symbolic birds-eye view of exits in a side window. The name of the current location is displayed as the title of the graphic window. A characteristic feature is the "self" window which provides a reference to the player himself.

The point-and-click approach means that no text commands are used except for occasional speech entered in a dialog box. Events taking place in the graphic window, as well as the result of the "examine" command (similar to "look" in other adventure games) are explained in a text window which also acts as a log of recent gameplay.

=== Content ===
The four MacVenture games all take place in settings common to movies. Two are hardboiled detective adventures, one is a haunted house ghost story, and the fourth a fantasy quest. The series has a lot of detail put into the game environment, in the form of a multitude of objects being able to act on each other. This gives a sense of depth to the environment, and allows the player to have the freedom to travel back and forth from room to room or street to street as they please which makes for very non-linear gameplay.

Possibly to counter this liberty, all MacVenture games have some kind of time limit woven into the story. In Shadowgate, the player must collect torches to be able to look around, in Uninvited, evil forces gradually take control and create visions at unexpected times. In Déjà Vu, the character has been injected with a poison, and has limited time to find the antidote. In Déjà Vu II, the character is told to collect money or he will be killed.

Graphics are shown in a 256×171-pixel window and, although interactive, remain mostly static. Some limited animation is featured on player-initiated actions and when entering a room. In Uninvited, Shadowgate and Déjà Vu II, the about box has an animated presentation of the development team in the style of the game, accompanied by music.

The text element is notably literate and plays a role in the character of the games. Object and location descriptions are written in a recognizable style, and descriptions of the player character can be quite disparaging (for example, looking at a flower vase in Uninvited, you are told, "It looks like a goldfish bowl, but it's serving as a vase. Function before form, perhaps -- just as in your case.").

=== Sound ===
The MacVentures make use of the original Mac's sound hardware, which allows for 22 kHz mono digitized sound. Sound effects consist mostly of door creaks and other noises related to actions, but Uninvited also presents some ambient sounds.

Except for the "Winchester Cathedral" sound in Uninvited, there is no music in the gameplay of the MacVentures. However, the three latter games feature about boxes with music and have ending scores.

=== Characteristic features ===
- The freedom to pick up (most) objects and drop them at another location, at any chosen position. This could create annoyingly realistic "where did I put that thing?" situations.
- The ability to put things inside hollow objects such as jars, bowls or drawers. Doing this increases the number of objects that can be carried in the inventory.
- The "self" window containing an object referencing the main character. In Déjà Vu and Uninvited, the self is simply an oval with the text SELF, in Shadowgate and Déjà Vu II, it is decorated in the theme of the game. Clicking in the background of the inventory window acts as a shortcut for selecting "self".
- When starting over by selecting "New", the player is greeted by "Good morning"/-"afternoon"/-"evening" depending on the time of day.
- Saved games are stored as ordinary files, unlike the more common save slots used in adventure games at this time.
- When completing the game, the player is given the option to enter her/his name and print a diploma in the theme of the game.

== Ports ==
The MacVenture games were ported to a multitude of platforms, including game consoles. Due to hardware limitations, and possibly varying expectations on the user demographic, the games were limited when ported to different platforms—particularly the Nintendo Entertainment System (NES). The Amiga and Apple IIGS versions were translated rather faithfully and only lack some graphics detail (the Mac had typically twice their resolution). The MS-DOS versions use the 320×200 4-color CGA mode.

=== NES ports ===
Due to limited resolution and memory constraints inherent to the NES, a lot of detour game objects and interactions as well as some critical ones were removed. The "Consume" command was removed, and operating (renamed "use") could only be done with objects in the inventory. Also lost was the ability to rearrange objects by dragging and dropping, necessitating "take" and "leave" commands. Leaving could only be performed on unnecessary game objects, this in combination with numerous changes uncalled for by technical constraints caused a much more guided and linear gameplay. For instance, in NES Déjà Vu, the player is prohibited from leaving the bathroom without having looked in the mirror.

The descriptive texts were rewritten in a shorter and more simplified vocabulary (there is no sign of a coordinated attempt, as some of the more literate game texts were left unaltered). Some of these alterations were most likely made in accordance with Nintendo's censorship policy of the time. In Uninvited, the spells were turned into objects with names directly hinting at their use and the texts were also explicated to relieve players of unfolding the story by themselves. The digitized sound effects were removed, and music was introduced, giving the game more of an arcade feel.

=== Release dates ===
	Déjà Vu	Uninvited	Shadowgate	Déjà Vu II
Mac	1985	1986	1987	1988
Amiga	1986	1987	1987	1989
Atari ST	1987	1987	n/a	1989
MS-DOS	1987	1987	1988	1990
Commodore 64	1987	1988	n/a	n/a
Apple IIGS	1988	1988	1988	1989
NES	1990	1989	1989	n/a
Game Boy Color	1999	n/a	2000	1999

== Remakes ==
In the early 1990s, ICOM Simulations made new versions of the four MacVentures for Windows 3.1 (the previous DOS ports used custom controls rather than Windows). These versions used a similar engine and the same objects and text. However, graphics and sound were completely remade (save for the "Winchester Cathedral" record in Uninvited) with little effort to adhere to the game environments as depicted in the original versions. This created several anomalies where the textual descriptions do not match the way objects look.

The remade graphics were also used in the Infinite Ventures releases for Pocket PC.

Zojoi released a digital-only remake of Shadowgate for Windows, Mac, Linux, and iOS in 2014 via Steam, GOG.com, and the App Store. While the game has a similar room layout to the original, the graphics, plot, and puzzles have all been redone. This remake was ported to consoles by Abstraction Games and released in April 2019 for the Nintendo Switch, PlayStation 4 (via PlayStation Network), and Xbox One (via Xbox Live).

== Reception ==
The MacVenture series sold 2 million units by 2003.

== See also ==
- ICOM Simulations
- World Builder
- Zojoi
