= Road Runner's Death Valley Rally =

1992 video game

- North American box art
- Developer: ICOM Simulations
- Publisher: Sunsoft
- Producer: David Marsh
- Programmer: Mike Garber
- Artists: Jeff Troutman; Brian Babendererde
- Composer: Nu Romantic Productions
- Platform: Super NES
- Release: NA: November 1992; JP: December 22, 1992; EU: September 30, 1993; BR: December 1993
- Genre: Platform
- Mode: Single-player

Road Runner's Death Valley Rally (known in Japan as Looney Tunes: Road Runner vs. Wile E. Coyote (LOONEY TUNES ロードランナーvs.ワイリーコヨーテ) and in Europe as Looney Tunes: Road Runner) is a 1992 video game developed by ICOM Simulations and published by Sunsoft for the Super Nintendo Entertainment System. It is based on the Looney Tunes characters Wile E. Coyote and the Road Runner.

== Gameplay ==
Road Runner's Death Valley Rally features side-scrolling platform gameplay. The player controls Road Runner, who must avoid being eaten by Wile E. Coyote. The game consists of five different environments, with each one containing three levels and a boss battle. Coyote has a unique method of ambush for every level, ranging from the Acme Batman outfit to explosives, and for every level there is a cutscene of the contraption failing once the player crosses the finish mark. After every three levels, Road Runner battles against one of Wile E. Coyote's super weapons in a boss fight.

Road Runner has a series of control movements useful to beating the game, including jumping and running. Road Runner can also peck his beak to kill enemies, and can eat bird seeds that give him a burst of turbo speed, allowing him to scale walls. However, turbo speed can only be used a limited number of times, as it depletes the bird seeds; additional turbo speed is gained by consuming more bird seeds. The boost also acts as an invincibility, being able to destroy enemies and resist damage from Coyote. The player can also make Road Runner say "meep-meep!" and make him stick out his tongue, although neither serves a gameplay function.

Throughout the levels, there are four kinds of flags that players can find and raise. Flags award points and act checkpoints if the player loses a life. Flags worth more points are rare (appearing once or twice per level), while the flags worth the least points are more plentiful (appearing 4-8 times in each level). The levels also include road signs, which can indicate the direction of the level's endpoint, warn of danger, or hint to special items or hidden areas.

== Reception ==
Reception

Review scores
Publication	Score
Computer and Video Games	70/100
Electronic Gaming Monthly	8/10, 9/10, 8/10, 8/10
Famitsu	7/10, 6/10, 6/10, 6/10
GameFan	86%, 84%, 78%, 74%
GamesMaster	49%
Official Nintendo Magazine	39/100
Super Play	42%
Total!	(UK) 75% (DE) 2
VideoGames & Computer Entertainment	8/10
Control	60%
Electronic Games	92%
Entertainment Weekly	B
Hippon Super!	6/10
Marukatsu Super Famicom	9/10, 7/10, 6/10, 6/10
N-Force	89/100
Nintendo Game Zone	60/100
SNES Force	84%
Super Action	88%
The Super Famicom	60/100
Super Pro	82/100

Road Runner's Death Valley Rally received average critical reception. Entertainment Weekly's Lou Kesten found it to be a fun, fast-paced game similar to Mario, stating that it evokes the classic Warner Bros. cartoons from the 1950s.

Super Play's Jonathan Davies criticized the game's platforming levels, horrible controls, poor collision detection, lack of a password feature, and high difficulty. Official Nintendo Magazine described the game as a disaster, finding little to praise outside its graphics. They criticized the gameplay, highlighting how the sprites are too big for the screen compared to the platforms which results in trial and error as players try to guess platform's locations and eliminates any feeling of speed. They found the game to be dull, tedious, and frustrating.

Nintendo Power ranked the game 10# in their Top SNES Games of 1992 writing: "The feeling of the classic cartoon is captured through great character animations, sampled sounds and hilarious defeat scenes for Wile E. Coyote."

== Cancelled sequel ==
A sequel, titled Wile E's Revenge, was in development by Software Creations and was planned as a follow-up to Death Valley Ralley. Unlike the first game, the sequel would allow the user to control Wile E. Coyote as he chases the Road Runner. The game was cancelled because of Sun Corporation of America's bankruptcy in 1995.
