= Deja Vu II: Lost in Las Vegas =

1988 video game

- Amiga box art
- Developer: ICOM Simulations (Note: Game Boy Color version developed by Kemco.)
- Publishers: Mindscape; Game Boy Color; Kemco
- Composers: Game Boy Color; Koji Nishikawa; Masaomi Miura
- Engine: MacVenture
- Platforms: Macintosh, Atari ST, Amiga, Apple IIGS, MS-DOS, Game Boy Color, Windows, Pocket PC
- Release: December 1988: Macintosh, Atari ST; NA: December 1988 Amiga, Apple IIGS; NA: May 1989 MS-DOS; NA: 1990 Game Boy Color; NA: 1999
- Genre: Point-and-click adventure
- Mode: Single-player

Deja Vu II: Lost in Las Vegas is a 1988 point-and-click adventure game developed by ICOM Simulations and published by Mindscape. It is the sequel to Deja Vu: A Nightmare Comes True (1985), and the last game in the MacVenture series. The game was first released in 1988 for Macintosh, and was later ported to several other platforms. Set in the world of 1940s hardboiled detective novels and movies, the story follows private detective Ace Harding as he becomes involved in a conflict between several gangsters in Las Vegas.

Deja Vu II received generally mixed reviews; critics praised the story but were divided on the gameplay and puzzles. A port for the Nintendo Entertainment System was advertised in an issue of Nintendo Power in 1993, but was cancelled mid-development, possibly due to it being near the end of the NES's lifespan. A version for the Game Boy Color, developed by Kemco, was released as part of Deja Vu I & II: The Casebooks of Ace Harding in 1999. Like its predecessor, elements were censored in this version, such as replacing the game over screen depicting a gun-wielding Grim Reaper with a gravestone. However, some scenes, including the ending, were expanded upon with more detail.

== Plot ==
In the late 1940s, private investigator and former boxer Theodore "Ace" Harding, some time after proving his innocence for the murder of Joey Siegel, is kidnapped in the middle of the night and knocked unconscious. He awakens in a bathroom at the Las Vegas Lucky Dice Hotel and Casino, with his memory still intact. It soon becomes apparent that Siegel's boss, Vegas mobster Tony Malone, is missing $112,000. Ace is considered the man responsible for the money being missing, as he was the last person Siegel talked to prior to his death; Ace has to return the money within a week or face the classic "or else" of being killed by Malone's personal hitman, Stogie Martin.

Looking for clues as to the location of the missing money, Ace comes across a pair of ledgers, where he discovers that the stolen money was spent on bribing the police into being loyal to Daniel Ventini, an associate mobster of Malone's who is secretly plotting against him. With no chance of actually recovering the missing money, Ace realizes there is only one way to escape his potentially lethal situation. By planting significant evidence of Ventini's treachery in Malone's office, as well as evidence saying Malone is aware of the act in Ventini's office, Ace initiates a gang war between the two crime families, during which he escapes Las Vegas undetected, while the two mobsters perish in the conflict.

== Gameplay ==
Gameplay of the Macintosh version

Deja Vu II begins in a sparsely populated Las Vegas reminiscent of the movie Bugsy, with just a few locations to explore. However, the player has the option to take the train to other cities including Chicago (where locations from Deja Vu I are revisited), Los Angeles, St. Louis, and New York City; however, going to the three latter cities without completing the final task will result in the player being executed by Stogie. Despite being a sequel, the game's background story is explained in-game, and Deja Vu II can be played without any knowledge of its predecessor. In fact, there are situations where experience with Deja Vu I can be a disadvantage by creating certain expectations – for instance, the phone in the office at Joe's Bar cannot be opened in Deja Vu I, while in Deja Vu II, it contains an important item.

There is also a police presence in Deja Vu II, though they are not after Ace directly like in the first game. Here, Ace can be arrested immediately following the player doing some unlawful act in a public location. Examples of offenses are disturbing the peace (by breaking glass or firing a gun), indecent exposure (not wearing any clothes), assault (hitting an innocent person), impersonating a peace officer (if found wearing the police uniform at random public places where it is not required to advance), or murder (shooting or stabbing an innocent person); attempting to enter the Chicago police station also results in Ace's arrest. If Ace is arrested for murder, he is executed via electric chair, while for other crimes, he is imprisoned; Stogie soon arrives, ostensibly to bail him out, only to take him to either the middle of a desert in Nevada or a graveyard in Chicago and shoot him dead. In the Game Boy Color release, getting arrested, whether for murder or not, leads to a truncated version of the latter ending.

Like the other MacVenture games, there is a time limit; in this case the hitman Stogie, who periodically reminds Ace to "come up with the dough". If the player takes too long, Stogie will gun down Ace. The Game Boy Color release retains the game's time limit, unlike the Nintendo versions of Deja Vu I. Although no longer affected by drug-induced amnesia (as in Deja Vu I), the player still experiences memory flashbacks when encountering certain environments or photographs, or examining certain objects.

== Reception ==
Deja Vu II: Lost in Las Vegas received generally mixed reviews. The French magazine Jeux & Stratégie awarded the game 8/10, calling it "an almost perfect adventure game" but noting the lack of a French translation. Compute! was also positive, stating that Deja Vu II had "a quality plot and a clever interface". Macworld reviewed the Macintosh version of Deja Vu II, praising its standalone story to its predecessor, and stated that "Deja Vu II is not the perfect interactive game, but it is a superior effort. By keeping your wits about you, and not consulting the hint book too often, you should enjoy hours of solid fun and adventure". Macworld expressed that in some instances puzzles "[defy] ordinary logic, making the purchase of the $5 hint book virtually mandatory", and also criticized the presence of copy protection. Dave Arneson of Computer Gaming World gave the Macintosh version a negative review: "Linear text games with 'Guess The Commands' are right down on the bottom of my list of boring ways to waste time". He gave an example how the command "operate - flashlight" wields the flashlight as a weapon, while "Flashlight - operate - flashlight" is needed to turn it on.

== See also ==
- Déjà Vu (video game)
