= Uninvited (video game) =

1986 video game

- Developer: ICOM Simulations (Note: NES version developed by Kemco)
- Publishers: Mindscape: NES; NA: Seika; JP: Kemco
- Composers: NES; Hiroyuki Masuno; Kento's Group
- Engine: MacVenture
- Platforms: Macintosh, Amiga, Atari ST, MS-DOS, Apple IIGS, Commodore 64, NES, Windows, Pocket PC
- Release: June 1986: Macintosh; NA: June 1986 Amiga; NA: March 1987 Atari ST; NA: February 1988 MS-DOS; NA: Late 1988 Apple IIGS; NA: 1988 C64; NA: February 1989 NES; JP: September 29, 1989; NA: June 1991 Windows; NA: 1993 Pocket PC; NA: October 31, 2002
- Genre: Point-and-click adventure
- Mode: Single-player

Uninvited is a 1986 point-and-click adventure game developed by ICOM Simulations and published by Mindscape for the Macintosh as part of the MacVenture series. The game was ported to the Amiga, Atari ST, MS-DOS, Apple IIGS, Commodore 64 and Nintendo Entertainment System.

== Plot ==
The unseen protagonist regains consciousness from a car crash in front of a tree. The protagonist's sibling (a younger brother in the PC versions, but an older sister in the NES version) is missing, and the car is soon destroyed, as it bursts into flames. Within sight from the wreckage lies an old mansion, which the protagonist enters out of curiosity. It is not long before they are greeted by the first undead dweller.

It gradually becomes evident that the mansion once belonged to a sorcerer with a number of apprentices. Dracan, the most talented apprentice, went Maverick and killed the other inhabitants with his magic, resulting in the mansion becoming haunted.

The protagonist travels through the mansion, avoiding or defeating the undead monsters along the way, before eventually finding Dracan's body frozen in an underground cavern. Implored by the sorcerer's ghost, the protagonist defeats Dracan by throwing him down a well before he can reawaken. They then locate their sibling in a hidden room at the top of the mansion, and defeat the spirit that had possessed their sibling. The protagonist and their sibling reunite and head home.

== Gameplay ==
Macintosh screenshot

The main house consists of two floors and a tower, most parts being in early 20th century style. Some rooms (e.g. the servant's bedroom) have newer decor. No help is to be found, as there is not a single living person inhabiting the house.

Aside from the house, there are three backyard buildings to explore: the observatory, where some of the final events take place; the greenhouse, which is not as infertile as it first seems; and the chapel, which leads into a cemetery maze. Several places are guarded by magical creatures, including apparitions, hellhounds, and zombies, as well as some more unconventional entities; one is a tiny demon that flies by periodically, holding a key.

There is also an art gallery room hidden in the house. To access the room, the player has to collect two lamps from a fireplace, and click an odd dot on a painting in a study room. The player will then be teleported to a room containing paintings and sculptures. A door in the art gallery room brings the player to the hall of the observatory. Accessing the art gallery is possible in all versions of Uninvited except those on the Commodore 64 and NES.

The quest to find the man’s sibling is a matter of gaining access to the locked parts of the estate. As in the other MacVenture games, there is a time limit. However, unlike a regular time limit that is based on seconds or minutes, the time limit in Uninvited is based on moves (a move is defined as either talking to a character, entering a room, observing an object, or using an item). If the player runs out of moves, the evil spell of the mansion takes control, and the player eventually ends up as a zombie. Since the story largely revolves around magic, many of the game's puzzles seem illogical. Hints for these and bits of the background story are unraveled in the diaries and scrolls found within the grounds. The game plays in a nonlinear fashion.

== Ports ==
The game was ported to the Amiga in 1987, followed by the Apple IIGS, Atari ST, and MS-DOS in 1988, and the Commodore 64 and Nintendo Entertainment System in 1989; the NES version was initially released in Japan before being released in North America in 1991. In 1993, an enhanced version of the game was released for Windows 3.1x.

=== NES version ===
As with the other NES MacVenture games, Uninvited, known in Japan as Akuma no Shōtaijō (悪魔の招待状; lit. "The Devil's Invitation"), added music, and elements of the written narration and storyline were altered, including:

- In the NES version, if the player uses the phonograph in the game room, a broken-record version of the main theme from the NES port of Shadowgate, another game in the MacVenture series, will play.
- The sibling trapped in the mansion is changed from a younger brother to an older sister in the NES version.
- The NES version has no time limit unless the player picks up a cursed ruby in one of the bedrooms. The player can drop the ruby to terminate the time limit.
- As with the other NES ports, the game texts were extremely simplified, in some cases also adding hints or elucidations for the gameplay. As an example, a hallway picture reads as follows in the NES version: "It's a small, [sic] painting of a young fellow."
- In the original game, the address in the letter was, "Master Crowley, 666 Blackwell Road, Loch Ness, Scotland". However, at the time the game was released, Nintendo of America had stringent policy necessitating the removal of any remotely offensive material. Rather than create a new address, it was simply shortened to "Master Crowley". This is likely a reference to occultist Aleister Crowley, but Nintendo (perhaps unknowingly) allowed the name to remain in the game. Other changes that may relate to censorship issues are pentagrams turned into stars (or, in one case, a ruby) and a cross into a goblet (while another cross that only served as decoration was removed altogether).
- Beyond the game texts being simplified for the NES port, some of the death texts were edited or altered due to their graphic descriptions.
- When performing magic, instead of typing magic words on a keyboard, the player simply scrolls through the inventory to select the spell.

The NES version was re-released in October 2017 for Windows, PlayStation 4, and Xbox One in a package called "8-Bit Adventure Anthology"; the anthology was developed by Abstraction Games.

== Reception ==
Macworld reviewed the Macintosh version of Uninvited positively, praising its "delightfully sarcastic commentary", "skillfully drawn and plentiful" graphics, and "intriguing and challenging plot", while noting that the puzzles were at times frustratingly difficult. Macworld felt Uninvited surpassed the previous MacVentures title Déjà Vu in the use of digitized sounds. The 1987 Macworld Game Hall of Fame noted that Uninvited maintained Déjà Vu's "graphic excellence and attention to detail—if not plot originality". German magazine Data Welt praised the Amiga version's user-friendliness, good graphics and particularly the atmospheric sound, calling the game (translated): "excellent" and "even better than Deja Vu". Computer Gaming World found the game to be enjoyable and innovative, praising the game's use of graphics and almost exclusive use of the mouse as a way of eliminating frustration. As such, the game was described as "much easier to work with than pure text or text and graphic adventure games." Dragon complimented the game, calling it "a truly horrifying adventure game and mystery that’ll leave you shivering in the dark". Compute! liked Uninvited's "fluid interface, solid logical puzzles, and something's-around-the-corner feel". Video Games: The Ultimate Gaming Magazine gave the Windows version 8 out of 10.

== Sequels ==
On September 25, 2025, Zojoi announced The Uninvited 2:Let Nothing You Dismay on Steam. According to the trailer, the game will be available in both English and Japanese. It will release on the following platforms: Microsoft Windows, Macintosh, Nintendo Switch, PlayStation 4, PlayStation 5, and Xbox Series X/S.

== See also ==
- The Legacy: Realm of Terror
