= Sherlock Holmes: Consulting Detective Vol. II =

1992 video game

- Developer: ICOM Simulations
- Platforms: Mega-CD, TurboGrafx-CD, MS-DOS, Classic Mac OS, Tandy Video Information System
- Release: 1992
- Genres: Adventure, interactive movie
- Mode: Single-player

Sherlock Holmes: Consulting Detective Vol. II is a full motion video game released in 1992 for the Mega-CD, TurboGrafx-CD, Classic Mac OS, Tandy Video Information System, and MS-DOS. The game is based on the adventures of detective Sherlock Holmes, and his assistant, Dr. John Watson. The game is a sequel to Sherlock Holmes: Consulting Detective.

== Gameplay ==
The format of the game is the same as the first, except that there are three new and unrelated cases to solve.

=== The Two Lions ===
This investigation takes place on 17 August 1888. Holmes receives a mysterious note on his door leading him and Watson to investigate the death of two lions who were part of a traveling animal show. At the same time a mysterious death is discovered that might tie the two cases together.

=== The Pilfered Paintings ===
This case is set on 22 January 1891. A pair of paintings, from a recently famed artist known as DeKuyper, are stolen from the National Gallery just days before they were to be revealed to the public in an art show. The unusual circumstances in which the paintings were originally acquired by the gallery only deepen the mystery.

=== The Murdered Munitions Magnate ===
This case takes place on 20 March 1888. Courtney Allen, a wealthy industrialist of a gun factory, is murdered in an alley just outside his office. Scotland Yard believes it was a robbery as certain valuable contents that Allen had on him were also stolen. As Holmes and Watson investigate, they learn of a secret government project that Allen's company was involved in and its possible connection to the crime.

== Reception ==
Computer Gaming World liked the interface and the improved quality of the video clips, but criticized the game's short length (recommending five cases, not three) and lack of background music. While warning gamers that it was not a Sierra- or LucasArts-like point and click adventure, the magazine concluded that Sherlock Holmes would "provide several captivating hours of armchair investigation".

== Legacy ==
A sequel, Sherlock Holmes: Consulting Detective Vol. III, was released in 1993.
