= Déjà Vu (video game) =

1985 video game

- Box art for the computer versions
- Developers: ICOM Simulations, Inc. Kemco (NES, GBC)
- Publishers: Mindscape; Kemco (NES, GBC)
- Composers: Hiroyuki Masuno, Kento's Group (NES); Koji Nishikawa, Masaomi Miura (GBC)
- Engine: MacVenture
- Platforms: Apple IIGS, Macintosh, Atari ST, Commodore 64, Amiga, MS-DOS, Game Boy Color, PC-9800, Pocket PC, Famicom/NES, PlayStation 4, Windows 3.x
- Release: October 1985: Macintosh; NA: October 1985 MS-DOS; NA: 1987 NES; JP: 1988; NA: 1990; EU: 1992 Windows 3.1; NA: 1991 Game Boy Color; NA: 1999 PlayStation 4, Xbox One; WW: 2017
- Genre: Adventure
- Mode: Single-player

Déjà Vu (Note: Accent marks do not appear on the original game boxes or in-game logo, where the title is written as Deja Vu. However, accent marks appear in the text on the back of the box and in the logos for the NES and Game Boy Color ports. Some sources also add an additional subtitle of "A Nightmare Comes True!!", a tagline that is absent from the in-game logo and NES game box.) is a 1985 point-and-click adventure game developed by ICOM Simulations for the Macintosh as the first entry in the MacVenture series. Set in 1940s Chicago, the story follows detective Ace Harding as he attempts to clear his name and restore his memories after being framed for a murder. It is themed after various hardboiled detective novels and films.

Déjà Vu was first released in October 1985. It was later ported to several other platforms, including the Amiga, MS-DOS, and the Nintendo Entertainment System. Initially, the game featured black and white graphics; later releases introduced color. A sequel, Deja Vu II: Lost in Las Vegas, was released in 1988.

== Plot and gameplay ==
Macintosh version of Déjà Vu

The game takes place in Chicago in 1942 (though a newspaper in-game would imply it is set during December 1941 as there is a reference to the bombing of Pearl Harbor). The game character is Theodore "Ace" Harding, a retired boxer working as a private eye.

Ace awakes one morning in a bathroom stall in Joe's Bar, unable to remember who he is. A dead man is found in an upstairs office, and Ace is about to be framed for the murder. There are some clues as to the identity of the murdered man and to Ace himself. A strap-down chair, mysterious vials, and a syringe are found, suggesting (together with a needle mark on Ace's arm) that an interrogation has taken place.

Outside the bar, Ace encounters adversaries including a mugger, an old acquaintance with a grudge, and the police. Ace's boxing background proves to be a valuable asset. Ace must find addresses around Joe's bar and then make taxi rides to a few locations (including his office) to gather more information and unravel the story. It involves a kidnapping in which Ace has played some part, but his memory lacks the important details.

Ace's memory and mental condition progressively deteriorate, therefore the first major puzzle the player is required to solve involves obtaining an antidote to the drug that caused the memory loss. In the original and subsequent ports, except the Nintendo versions, the player has a limited amount of time before Ace's brain reaches vegetative status and has to live the rest of his days in a hospital for "helpless mental invalids"; in addition, Ace will die on the second floor of Sternwood Mansion if he goes there before taking the antidote. If the antidote is administered, Ace starts to have recurring flashbacks filled with information which helps the player evaluate the evidence and take action accordingly.

This game and its sequel, Deja Vu II: Lost in Las Vegas, require significant lateral thinking. Some situations are based on common detective techniques, while others require simple violence. Unlike other MacVenture titles such as Uninvited and Shadowgate, no supernatural events are present.

== Development ==
NES version

Déjà Vu was the first ICOM Simulations game to use the MacVenture interface and engine.

Numerous ports were made, including versions for home computer systems in 1987 and the Nintendo Entertainment System in 1990. Versions of the game and its sequel containing new graphics and sound were released for Microsoft Windows in the early 1990s, and later as a combined single-cartridge release for the Game Boy Color in 1999 under the title Déjà Vu I & II: The Casebooks of Ace Harding, which also was released for DOS, Windows 3.x (1992), and Windows Mobile (2002).

The Game Boy Color version is heavily censored and creates its own details such as renaming "Joe's Bar" to "Joe's Place" and adding other details that were not present in other versions to the point of contradiction, most notably with Ace's "Suzy Q" memory and "Father O'Malley" memory. This version also changes the ending of the first Déjà Vu game to better seamlessly lead into Déjà Vu II.

The memory deterioration mechanic was modified for the NES and Game Boy Color versions. The vegetable status mechanic and also the Sternwood Mansion death are removed if the player goes there without curing their amnesia. This gives the player unlimited time to find a cure, but still has a hard death coded if they go to Ace's office while suffering from amnesia in which the vegetable ending from the other platforms is immediately initiated. In 2017, the NES version was ported to PlayStation 4, Windows, and Xbox One as part of 8-bit Adventure Anthology, which also included the NES ports of Shadowgate and Uninvited.

== Reception ==
Déjà Vu was generally well-received. In an October 1985 review, Computer Entertainer awarded the game four out of four stars, calling it "a perfect evocation of a 1940s murder mystery" and praising the graphics, gameplay and storytelling. Macworld called it "a well-crafted game that's bound to draw you into its intriguing, albeit seedy, story", and noted how the game's point-and-click interface set it apart from text parser-based adventure games, freeing the player from "having to second guess the program's vocabulary and syntax". MacUser also gave the game a positive review, naming it the "Best Entertainment Program" for 1985.

Digital Press gave the NES version 6 out of 10, praising the puzzle-solving but considering the graphics and music to be average.

Macworld inducted Déjà Vu into its 1986 Game Hall of Fame in the Best Adventure Game category, praising the game for avoiding the common adventure game pitfall of puzzle-solving overwhelming the game's literary possibilities: "Aside from its debt to the film noir tradition, it discards verbal pretensions and lets you mouse-and-window your way to a solution to a hard-boiled murder tale." The game was named the Best Entertainment Product by the Software Publishers Association 1986.

The French magazine Jeux & Stratégie described the game as "a completely renewed approach to adventure games" and praised its interactivity.
