= Sherlock Holmes: Consulting Detective Vol. III =

1993 video game

- Developer: ICOM Simulations
- Platforms: DOS, Macintosh
- Release: 1993
- Genres: Adventure, interactive movie
- Mode: Single-player

Sherlock Holmes: Consulting Detective Vol. III is the title of a full-motion video computer game released for DOS and Mac OS. The game is a sequel to Sherlock Holmes: Consulting Detective Vol. II and was released in 1993.

== Cases ==
The format of the game is the same as the first two, except that there are three new cases to solve.

=== The Solicitous Solicitor ===
The case takes place on 26 June 1890, according to the newspaper in the game. Melvin Tuttle, a recently promoted solicitor, has apparently died of a heart attack. Inspector Lestrade of Scotland Yard recruits Holmes and Watson to investigate since he believes that Tuttle was poisoned. Along the way, Holmes and Watson learn of Tuttle's reputation for romancing various women, including the wife of one of his employers.

=== The Banker's Final Debt ===
The case takes place on 11 April 1890. Oswald Mason was murdered in his home by an intruder. At the request of the Chancellor of the Exchequer, who is concerned that it might have had something to do with Oswald's work at Her Majesty's Treasury, Scotland Yard's Inspector Gregson recruits Holmes and Watson to investigate Mason's death.

=== The Thames Murders ===
The case takes place on or shortly after 9 June 1890. A fifth body has been discovered in the Thames in a short amount of time. Inspector Lestrade is investigating the murders without success. Inspector Gregson asks Holmes and Watson to find a possible connection between all five deaths.

== Reception ==
Charles Ardai of Computer Gaming World stated in September 1993: "I fear that amidst all the hype, players are not being as demanding as they ought to be about what companies feed them in the name of multimedia entertainment". He believed that the Consulting Detective series had sold well (almost 250,000 copies) to those seeking "the thrill of seeing a new technology used, not of seeing a new technology used well", and who had little choice between Sherlock Holmes and The 7th Guest. Ardai criticized Vol. III describing itself as "interactive", noting that "one cannot do anything 'wrong'" and that it was possible to solve cases by brute force; users were "viewers more than they are players". He advised ICOM to hire "professionals, not just for the acting chores, but for writing and directing as well. There is only so long that the gaming audience will put up with paying good money (and not a little of it) to see the work of amateurs", but concluded that the game was "at least, decent. It is probably not worth buying all three volumes, but curious gamers should at least take a look at one of them".
