= Sherlock Holmes: Consulting Detective =

1991 video game

- Developer: ICOM Simulations
- Publishers: ICOM Simulations; Sega (Sega CD)
- Director: Kenneth Tarolla
- Producer: Kenneth Tarolla
- Programmers: Fred Allen; Michael Manning
- Artists: Katherine Tootelian; Michael Manning
- Writers: Laurie Rose Bauman; Annie Fox
- Platforms: FM Towns, CDTV, MS-DOS, TurboGrafx-CD, Classic Mac OS, Tandy VIS, Sega CD, DVD; Remaster iPad, Windows, OS X
- Release: NA: 1991; DVD; NA: 1999; iPad, Windows, OS X; NA: 2012
- Genres: Adventure, interactive movie
- Mode: Single-player

Sherlock Holmes: Consulting Detective is an interactive movie video game released in 1991. It is based on a tabletop game-gamebook hybrid of the same name first published in 1981, and features the fictional detective Sherlock Holmes, created by Arthur Conan Doyle.

The video game was developed by ICOM Simulations for the FM Towns computer and later ported to MS-DOS, Classic Mac OS, CDTV, TurboGrafx-CD, Sega CD, and Tandy Video Information System with all versions distributed on CD-ROM. The game was re-released as a DVD for use with a standard DVD player and television in 1999.

The game uses live actors in full motion video scenes as the player controls Sherlock Holmes and his longtime partner Dr. Watson, trying to solve three separate crimes by visiting various locations, listening to the dialogue, reading the included mock London newspapers, and, when the player gets enough evidence, answering the judge's questions.

A remastered version for iPad, Windows, and OS X was released in September 2012.

== Gameplay ==
At the beginning of each case, a full motion video clip depicts Holmes and Watson meeting a client and learning a few background clues about the case. The player must then choose a particular location or person from the directory to visit, read the London newspapers for clues or ask one of the young Baker Street Irregulars to investigate. A full motion video clip will play each time the player visits a relevant person or location. Selecting an irrelevant location to visit results in a short audio clip of dialogue between Holmes and Watson, and impacts the player's score. The object of each case is to gather enough clues in the lowest number of visits possible, then go before a judge who will then ask the player to answer the important questions about the case. If the player is successful, Dr. Watson will reveal the player's score, based on the number of visits it took to solve the case. The player can view a full motion video clip set in Holmes' and Watson's study where they will review the events that transpired.

There are several general informants (also portrayed by actors) who can be visited in multiple cases across the Consulting Detective games, including characters from Arthur Conan Doyle's Sherlock Holmes stories, namely Inspector Lestrade of Scotland Yard, former criminal Shinwell Johnson, and gossip columnist Langdale Pike.

== Plot ==
=== The Mummy's Curse ===
This investigation is set on 12 April 1889. Holmes and Watson learn about a series of mysterious deaths of three men who were part of an archeology trip to Egypt. Each man was found strangled and found with a sheath of a mummy's wrapping present at each murder. The London Times reports the deaths were caused by an ancient mummy, reducing their credibility. Holmes and Watson decide to take on the case to find the real culprit, but they face a challenge as all three murders were respectively orchestrated in London, Egypt and at sea.

=== The Mystified Murderess ===
This case takes place on 4 July 1888. Francis Nolan is found hovering over the body of her lover, Guy Clarendon, in a London hotel with a pistol in her hand. She is arrested for Guy's murder, despite having no memory of ever being there, nor purchasing the gun that was bought in her name. She insists that she is innocent as Holmes and Watson take on the case to see if she is telling the truth. Along the way, Holmes and Watson learn about Guy Clarendon's dubious activity at night.

=== The Tin Soldier ===
The investigation takes place on 10 June 1890. An old general is murdered in his home by a mysterious visitor who quickly vanishes from the scene of the crime. Holmes and Watson investigate to see whether the crime was due to the general's part in a Veteran Tontine lottery, a book he was writing on a missing diamond, a disgruntled marriage, or some hidden scandal deep in his past.

== Development ==
The game had a budget of more than $2 million.

== Reception ==
Reception

Review scores
Publication	Score
AllGame	2.5/5 (Sega CD)
Dragon	5/5 (TurboGrafx-CD)
Electronic Gaming Monthly	8/10, 9/10, 6/10, 7/10 (TurboGrafx-CD)
Wizard	B (Sega CD)

The three volumes of Sherlock Holmes: Consulting Detective sold over 360,000 copies across all platforms by 1994.

Dragon gave the TurboGrafx-CD version of Sherlock Holmes 5 out of 5 stars. Computer Gaming World favorably described the game's videos' production values as "low-end television production quality ... equal to an average public television production". The magazine recommended the game "with qualifications", calling it "a ground-breaking product with whiz-bang technology that demonstrates the full potential of multimedia", but with "limited play life" due to lack of replayability. In a review for Wizard, Glenn Rubenstein listed the use of live actors and the absence of slow down in the Sega CD version as strong points, but remarked "the interactivity level is lacking", and that the Sega CD version offered nothing new to those who had played any of the game's previous versions. He gave it a B. In a retrospective review, Jonathan Sutyak of Allgame gave the Sega CD version a score of 2.5 out of 5 stars praising the actors and the dialogue being clear and well acted, although commenting that there is a large amount of FMV and little gameplay and felt the game does not offer the player enough to do. He thought that Sherlock Holmes: Consulting Detective will probably bore those who like detective and adventure games.

== Legacy ==
A sequel was released in 1992, Sherlock Holmes: Consulting Detective Vol. II, with three new cases to be solved. A third volume, with three new cases, was also released, albeit not for the Sega CD nor the Turbografx-CD. In April 1994, Computer Gaming World said that video quality had improved during the three games of the series, with each offering "solid and professional" acting. The magazine added that the chief strengths of these games were the challenging cases for the players to solve.

In March 2012, a Kickstarter campaign was launched by David Marsh and his company Zojoi to help fund a high resolution and remastered version of the Sherlock Holmes: Consulting Detective Adventure Mysteries. The campaign was unsuccessful, as it was only able to attain a third of its $55,000 goal. Even though the Kickstarter was unsuccessful, the remastered version was still released. According to developer David Marsh, the Kickstarter money was never needed to fund the games, and Zojoi was just using the Kickstarter to raise awareness about them.
