= List of United Kingdom locations: Of-Old G =

The United Kingdom

This is part of the list of United Kingdom locations: a gazetteer of place names in the United Kingdom showing each place's locality and geographical coordinates.

== Of ==
Location	Locality	Coordinates (links to map & photo sources)	OS grid reference
Offchurch	Warwickshire	52.28°N 01.47°W	SP3665
Offenham	Worcestershire	52.11°N 01.92°W	SP0546
Offenham Cross	Worcestershire	52.10°N 01.91°W	SP0645
Offerton	Sunderland	54.88°N 01.47°W	NZ3455
Offerton	Stockport	53.38°N 02.13°W	SJ9188
Offerton Green	Stockport	53.38°N 02.10°W	SJ9388
Offham	West Sussex	50.86°N 00.55°W	TQ0208
Offham	East Sussex	50.89°N 00.01°W	TQ4012
Offham	Kent	51.28°N 00.36°E	TQ6557
Offleyhay	Staffordshire	52.85°N 02.31°W	SJ7929
Offleymarsh	Staffordshire	52.85°N 02.32°W	SJ7829
Offleyrock	Staffordshire	52.85°N 02.32°W	SJ7829
Offord Cluny	Cambridgeshire	52.28°N 00.22°W	TL2167
Offord D'Arcy	Cambridgeshire	52.27°N 00.22°W	TL2166
Offton	Suffolk	52.10°N 01.00°E	TM0649
Offwell	Devon	50.78°N 03.15°W	SY1999
Ogbourne Maizey	Wiltshire	51.43°N 01.74°W	SU1871
Ogbourne St Andrew	Wiltshire	51.44°N 01.74°W	SU1872
Ogbourne St George	Wiltshire	51.46°N 01.71°W	SU2074
Ogden	Calderdale	53.77°N 01.91°W	SE0631
Ogdens	Hampshire	50.90°N 01.74°W	SU1812
Ogle	Northumberland	55.09°N 01.79°W	NZ1378
Ogmore	Bro Morgannwg (The Vale Of Glamorgan)	51.47°N 03.61°W	SS8876
Ogmore-by-Sea	Bro Morgannwg (The Vale Of Glamorgan)	51.45°N 03.64°W	SS8674
Ogmore Vale	PenyBont ar Ogwr (Bridgend)	51.59°N 03.54°W	SS9390

== Oi ==
Location	Locality	Coordinates (links to map & photo sources)	OS grid reference
Oigh-sgeir	Highland	56.96°N 06.67°W	NM161961

== Ok ==
Location	Locality	Coordinates (links to map & photo sources)	OS grid reference
Okeford Fitzpaine	Dorset	50.88°N 02.28°W	ST8010
Okehampton	Devon	50.73°N 04.01°W	SX5895
Oker (or Oaker)	Derbyshire	53.14°N 01.59°W	SK2761
Okle Green	Gloucestershire	51.92°N 02.36°W	SO7525
Okus	Swindon	51.54°N 01.79°W	SU1483

== Ol ==
=== Ola – Old G ===
Location	Locality	Coordinates (links to map & photo sources)	OS grid reference
Olchard	Devon	50.58°N 03.59°W	SX8777
Old	Northamptonshire	52.34°N 00.85°W	SP7873
Old Aberdeen	City of Aberdeen	57.16°N 02.10°W	NJ9408
Old Alresford	Hampshire	51.10°N 01.17°W	SU5834
Oldany Island	Highland	58.25°N 05.26°W	NC088346
Old Arley	Warwickshire	52.50°N 01.58°W	SP2890
Old Balkello	Angus	56.53°N 03.04°W	NO3638
Old Balornock	City of Glasgow	55.87°N 04.22°W	NS6167
Old Basford	Nottinghamshire	52.98°N 01.18°W	SK5543
Old Basing	Hampshire	51.26°N 01.05°W	SU6652
Old Belses	Scottish Borders	55.50°N 02.69°W	NT5624
Oldberrow	Warwickshire	52.28°N 01.82°W	SP1265
Old Bexley	Bexley	51.43°N 00.14°E	TQ4973
Old Blair	Perth and Kinross	56.77°N 03.86°W	NN8666
Old Bolingbroke	Lincolnshire	53.15°N 00.01°E	TF3564
Oldborough	Devon	50.84°N 03.74°W	SS7706
Old Boston	St Helens	53.46°N 02.64°W	SJ5797
Old Bramhope	Leeds	53.88°N 01.65°W	SE2343
Old Brampton	Derbyshire	53.23°N 01.50°W	SK3371
Old Bridge of Tilt	Perth and Kinross	56.77°N 03.85°W	NN8766
Old Bridge of Urr	Dumfries and Galloway	54.98°N 03.92°W	NX7767
Oldbrook	Milton Keynes	52.02°N 00.76°W	SP8537
Old Buckenham	Norfolk	52.47°N 01.03°E	TM0691
Old Burdon	Durham	54.84°N 01.40°W	NZ3850
Old Burghclere	Hampshire	51.31°N 01.34°W	SU4657
Oldbury	Shropshire	52.51°N 02.44°W	SO7091
Oldbury	Sandwell	52.49°N 02.03°W	SO9888
Oldbury	Warwickshire	52.54°N 01.54°W	SP3194
Oldbury	Kent	51.28°N 00.26°E	TQ5856
Oldbury Naite	South Gloucestershire	51.63°N 02.55°W	ST6293
Oldbury-on-Severn	South Gloucestershire	51.62°N 02.56°W	ST6192
Oldbury on the Hill	Gloucestershire	51.59°N 02.27°W	ST8188
Old Byland	North Yorkshire	54.25°N 01.17°W	SE5485
Old Cambus	Scottish Borders	55.91°N 02.32°W	NT8069
Old Cardinham Castle	Cornwall	50.47°N 04.65°W	SX1267
Old Carlisle	Cumbria	54.80°N 03.15°W	NY2646
Old Cassop	Durham	54.74°N 01.48°W	NZ3339
Oldcastle	Monmouthshire	51.91°N 02.99°W	SO3224
Oldcastle Heath	Cheshire	53.00°N 02.79°W	SJ4745
Old Catton	Norfolk	52.66°N 01.29°E	TG2312
Old Chalford	Oxfordshire	51.92°N 01.50°W	SP3425
Old Church Stoke	Powys	52.53°N 03.06°W	SO2894
Old Clee	North East Lincolnshire	53.55°N 00.05°W	TA2908
Old Cleeve	Somerset	51.16°N 03.38°W	ST0341
Old Clipstone	Nottinghamshire	53.17°N 01.11°W	SK5964
Old Colwyn	Conwy	53.28°N 03.71°W	SH8678
Old Coppice	Shropshire	52.65°N 02.79°W	SJ4607
Old Cornhill	Aberdeenshire	57.59°N 02.72°W	NJ5756
Oldcotes	Nottinghamshire	53.38°N 01.12°W	SK5888
Old Coulsdon	Croydon	51.29°N 00.12°W	TQ3157
Old Country	Herefordshire	52.09°N 02.42°W	SO7144
Oldcroft	Gloucestershire	51.75°N 02.52°W	SO6406
Old Cryals	Kent	51.13°N 00.37°E	TQ6640
Old Dailly	South Ayrshire	55.25°N 04.80°W	NX2299
Old Dalby	Leicestershire	52.80°N 01.00°W	SK6723
Old Dam	Derbyshire	53.30°N 01.83°W	SK1179
Old Deer	Aberdeenshire	57.51°N 02.05°W	NJ9747
Old Denaby	Doncaster	53.48°N 01.27°W	SK4899
Old Ditch	Somerset	51.23°N 02.71°W	ST5049
Old Dolphin	Bradford	53.76°N 01.83°W	SE1130
Old Down	South Gloucestershire	51.58°N 02.56°W	ST6187
Old Down	Somerset	51.25°N 02.54°W	ST6251
Old Edlington	Doncaster	53.46°N 01.20°W	SK5397
Old Eldon	Durham	54.63°N 01.62°W	NZ2427
Old Ellerby	East Riding of Yorkshire	53.81°N 00.23°W	TA1637
Oldend	Gloucestershire	51.74°N 02.30°W	SO7905
Old Fallings	Wolverhampton	52.60°N 02.11°W	SJ9201
Oldfallow	Staffordshire	52.69°N 02.04°W	SJ9711
Old Farm Park	Milton Keynes	52.01°N 00.68°W	SP9036
Old Felixstowe	Suffolk	51.96°N 01.36°E	TM3135
Oldfield	Shropshire	52.48°N 02.48°W	SO6788
Old Field	Shropshire	52.38°N 02.75°W	SO4977
Oldfield	Worcestershire	52.27°N 02.23°W	SO8464
Oldfield	Cumbria	54.62°N 03.47°W	NY0527
Oldfield	Bradford	53.82°N 02.00°W	SE0037
Oldfield	Kirklees	53.58°N 01.80°W	SE1310
Oldfield Brow	Trafford	53.38°N 02.37°W	SJ7588
Oldfield Park	Bath and North East Somerset	51.37°N 02.38°W	ST7364
Old Fletton	Cambridgeshire	52.54°N 00.24°W	TL1996
Old Fold	Gateshead	54.95°N 01.57°W	NZ2762
Oldford	Somerset	51.24°N 02.31°W	ST7850
Old Ford	Tower Hamlets	51.52°N 00.04°W	TQ3683
Old Forge	Herefordshire	51.85°N 02.65°W	SO5518
Old Furnace	Torfaen	51.69°N 03.07°W	SO2600
Oldfurnace	Staffordshire	52.98°N 01.94°W	SK0443
Old Gate	Lincolnshire	52.75°N 00.08°E	TF4120
Old Glossop	Derbyshire	53.44°N 01.94°W	SK0494
Old Goginan	Ceredigion	52.41°N 03.94°W	SN6881
Old Goole	East Riding of Yorkshire	53.68°N 00.88°W	SE7422
Old Gore	Herefordshire	51.94°N 02.55°W	SO6228
Old Graitney	Dumfries and Galloway	54.98°N 03.07°W	NY3166
Old Grimsby	Isles of Scilly	49.95°N 06.33°W	SV8915
