= Barney Bear (game series) =

- Title screen for the first game in the series, Barney Bear Goes to School
- Genre: Educational video game
- Publisher: Free Spirit Software Inc.
- Platforms: Amiga, CDTV, Microsoft DOS

The Barney Bear series is a collection of educational video games intended for children aged 2–6, released between 1990 and 1991, programmed by Dave Krohne with artwork by Stephen Beam. Each was published by Free Spirit Software Inc. in a departure from previous adult-oriented erotic games. The Barney Bear games are presented as interactive picture books narrated by a synthesized voice. In each game, the protagonist Barney Bear goes to a new location where players are presented with a simple story and activities.

There are five Barney Bear titles:

- Barney Bear Goes to School (1990)
- Barney Bear Goes to the Farm (1990)
- Barney Bear Goes to Space (1990)
- Barney Bear Meets Santa Claus (1990)
- Barney Bear Goes Camping (1991)

== Reception ==
The games were well received for their intended audience of young children, particularly as a way to acclimate children to then-novel home computers. The Chicago Tribune described the series as "simple but fun." Computer Game Review was more critical and called Barney Bear Goes to School "palatable" for young children but compared it unfavorably to contemporary educational titles such as Mixed-Up Mother Goose, stating that Barney Bear was "awfully thin for a multimedia product."

One reporter referred to Barney Bear as "my old nemesis" after receiving numerous press releases about the games at the World of Commodore expo.
