= PetSynth =

PetSynth is an open-source music software for the Commodore PET computer, created in 2008 by Chiron Bramberger. It is noteworthy for being the only keyboard playable synthesizer for the Commodore PET that supports stereo sound and is released under a GPL license. It has been featured in print and web publications such as Return Magazin, TPUG Magazine, Commodore Free Magazine, Retrothing, and MatrixSynth.

== History ==
Chiron Bramberger created PetSynth after discovering similar software for the Apple II, Apple IIGS, VIC-20, and Commodore 64. The first version of PetSynth was released in 2007. Since then, there have been several revisions, with the third version demonstrated at the TPUG World of Commodore in 2013.

== Features ==
The original version of the software allowed a user to play on the keyboard layout as if it were a musical piano keyboard. It included several effects that allowed the player to change the sounds in interesting ways as they played. The third version, as of 2013, included support for a MIDI adapter, and a second voice feature never before realized. This allowed for stereo sound on a Commodore PET for the first time.

== See also ==
- List of music software
