= Oldfield =

Oldfield, old field, old fields or oldfields may refer to:

== Old fields ==
- Old field (ecology), land previously cultivated but now abandoned
- Old field or Indian old field, abandoned Native American cultivated fields

== Places ==
=== England ===
- Oldfield, Cumbria, a location
- Oldfield, Shropshire, a location
- Oldfields Ground, a cricket ground in Uttoxeter, Staffordshire
- Oldfield, West Yorkshire, a hamlet in Bradford district
- Oldfield, Kirklees, a location in West Yorkshire
- Oldfield, Worcestershire, a location

=== United States ===
- Oldfield, Missouri, an unincorporated community
- Old Field, New York, a village
- Oldfields, Virginia, an unincorporated community
- Old Fields, West Virginia, an unincorporated community
- Oldfields, a house and estate forming part of the Indianapolis Museum of Art in Indiana
- Oldfield Point, Maryland, Landing place of General Howe prior to the Battle of Brandywine

=== Other countries ===
- Oldfield, Ontario, Canada, a rural community
- Oldfield River, a river in Western Australia

== People ==
- Oldfield (name), list of people called Oldfield

== Wildlife ==
- Oldfieldia, a plant genus in the family Picrodendraceae
- Oldfieldioideae, a former subfamily of Euphorbiaceae now regarded as a family, called Picrodendraceae
- Oldfield clover or hare's-foot clover, Trifolium arvense
- Oldfield mouse or beach mouse (Peromyscus polionotus), a North American species of rodent in the family Cricetidae
- Oldfield mouse, any of the South American species of rodent in the genus Thomasomys in the family Cricetidae
- Old-field toadflax, Nuttallanthus canadensis

== Schools ==
- Oldfield Boys' School, former boys' secondary school in Bath, England
- Oldfield School, coeducational secondary school in Bath, England
- Oldfields School, girls' boarding school in Baltimore County, Maryland, United States

== Other ==
- 5656 Oldfield, an asteroid
