= Brigade Commander (video game) =

1991 video game

- Developer: TTR Development
- Publisher: TTR Development
- Platform: Amiga
- Release: 1991
- Genre: Real-time strategy

Brigade Commander is a 1991 video game published by TTR Development.

== Gameplay ==
Brigade Commander is a real time tactical wargame in which the modern units are platoons represented on a hex map.

== Reception ==
Leah Wesolowski reviewed the game for Computer Gaming World, and stated that "With much of the work taken out of wargaming, along with its real-time movement and its built-in editor, this game is truly a die-hard wargamer's dream. It is, in this reviewer's opinion, destined to become a classic for Amiga computer wargamers."

Tom Malcom for Info gave the game three stars and said "Wargamers will probably find Brigade Commander interesting, but they're the only ones who will."
