= .info (magazine) =

American computer magazine (1983–1992)

- Editor: Benn Dunnington
- Categories: Computer magazine
- Frequency: Monthly (approx)
- Circulation: < 50,000
- First issue: September 1983
- Final issue Number: April 1992; Issue 49
- Company: Info Publications Ltd
- Country: United States, Canada
- Language: English
- ISSN: 0897-5868

.info (originally INFO=64 and later INFO) was a computer magazine covering Commodore 8-bit computers and later the Amiga. It was published from 1983 to 1992.

== History ==
INFO=64 began as a newsletter published by its founder, Benn Dunnington, operating out of a spare bedroom in his home. After a few issues, the entrepreneurial spirit struck and he decided to expand it into a full-fledged magazine.

The first few issues of the magazine were published by Dunnington operating as a sole proprietorship in the state of Washington. After a few issues, he moved the company to Iowa, eventually incorporating as Info Publications, Inc.. This, in turn, became a limited partnership, (Info Publications Ltd), which published the magazine until its demise.

INFO=64 was produced using personal computers. An editorial statement in each issue explained that the magazine was produced using only "lay equipment", such as home computers and 35mm cameras, that were inexpensively available to the general public. Early issues were typeset using a Commodore 64 and a dot-matrix printer, giving the magazine a distinctive hand-crafted appearance.

INFO=64 changed its name to INFO from issue 8, September-October 1985, reflecting its expanded coverage of Commodore computing. The magazine soon switched to a more professional appearance using laser printers with Springboard Software's The Newsroom or Berkeley Softworks' GEOS geoPublish software for 8-bit Commodores, before changing its editorial focus and publishing platform to the Amiga, and changing its name in issue 32, September 1990, to .info which was coincidentally the file extension of Amiga icon files. The magazine switched to its new name and exclusive focus on the Amiga because by 1990 there was no news to cover or advertising interest in 8-bit Commodores.

The Computer Press Association named .info as one of two 'Runners-Up' in the category of Best Computer Magazine – Circulation Less Than 50,000 at its seventh annual awards ceremony in April 1992. Computers in Accounting won that category, which included well over 100 computer magazines at the time, but .info tied with the slicker and much better-funded NeXTWORLD.

Ironically, .info was in serious financial trouble by then, and the publisher was desperately seeking someone to buy the magazine. The magazine closed its doors in April 1992, and on September 20 the magazine's assets were auctioned off.

Over the course of its run, .info absorbed three pioneering Commodore magazines that ceased publication during the "great extinction" that struck computer magazines in the late 1980s. These were Jim Oldfield and James Strassma's Midnite Software Gazette (which had previously absorbed 'The Paper', one of the oldest independent publications supporting Commodore computers), Mitch Lopes' RoboCity News (the one-time official publication of FAUG, the First Amiga Users' Group, before it was spun off), and Chris Zamara and Nick Sullivan's Transactor (the official publication of TPUG, the Toronto PET Users' Group). When .info ceased publication, the receivers stood in the way of allowing its publisher to find another magazine to fulfill its subscriptions.

A full set of the entire run of INFO magazine, including photocopies of the original newsletter along with other documents related to the magazine, is housed in the library of the State Historical Society of Iowa in Iowa City, Iowa. Scans and full text of most issues of INFO are available at archive.org.

== Staff and writers ==
- Benn Dunnington – Founder, Publisher, Editor
- Mark R. Brown – Managing Editor
- Tom Malcom – Senior Editor
- Jim Oldfield – Associate Editor (after acquisition of 'Midnite Software Gazette')
- Carol Brown – Advertising Director (through issue 31)
- Anna Folkers – Advertising Director (issues 32–49)
- Megan Ward – Art & Production Director
- Kent A. Embree – Art & Production Assistant
- Tony Bodensteiner – Art & Production Assistant
- Marty Amorin – Data Manager (early issues)
- Judith Kilbury-Cobb – Data Manager (through issue 47) / Staff Writer
- Krista L. Kapacinskas – Data Manager (issue 49)
- Chris Zamara – Technical Editor (after acquisition of 'The Transactor')
- Nick Sullivan – Technical Editor (after acquisition of 'The Transactor')
- Bradley W. Schenck – Contributing Editor / Graphics Columnist
- Harv Laser – Contributing Editor / Multimedia Columnist
- Peggy Herrington – Contributing Editor / Music & Sounds Columnist (through issue 42)
- Bob Lindstrom – Contributing Editor / Music Columnist (issues 44–49)
- Oran J. Sands III – Contributing Editor / Video Columnist
- Jeff Lowenthal – Contributing Editor / Public Domain Columnist
- Don Romero – Contributing Editor / GEOS Columnist & 'CHUMP' computer magazine parody guru
- Jim Meyer – Contributing Editor / Productivity Software Reviewer
- Mort Kevelson – Contributing Editor / Hardware Reviewer
- Gregory Conley – Contributing Editor / Cartoonist
- Warren Block – Contributing Editor
- David Martin – Writer
- Bob Baker – Writer
- Daniel Barrett – Writer
- Mindy Skelton – Writer
- Jim Butterfield – Writer
- Dave Haynie – Writer
