= Personal Computer Museum =

Former museum in Ontario, Canada

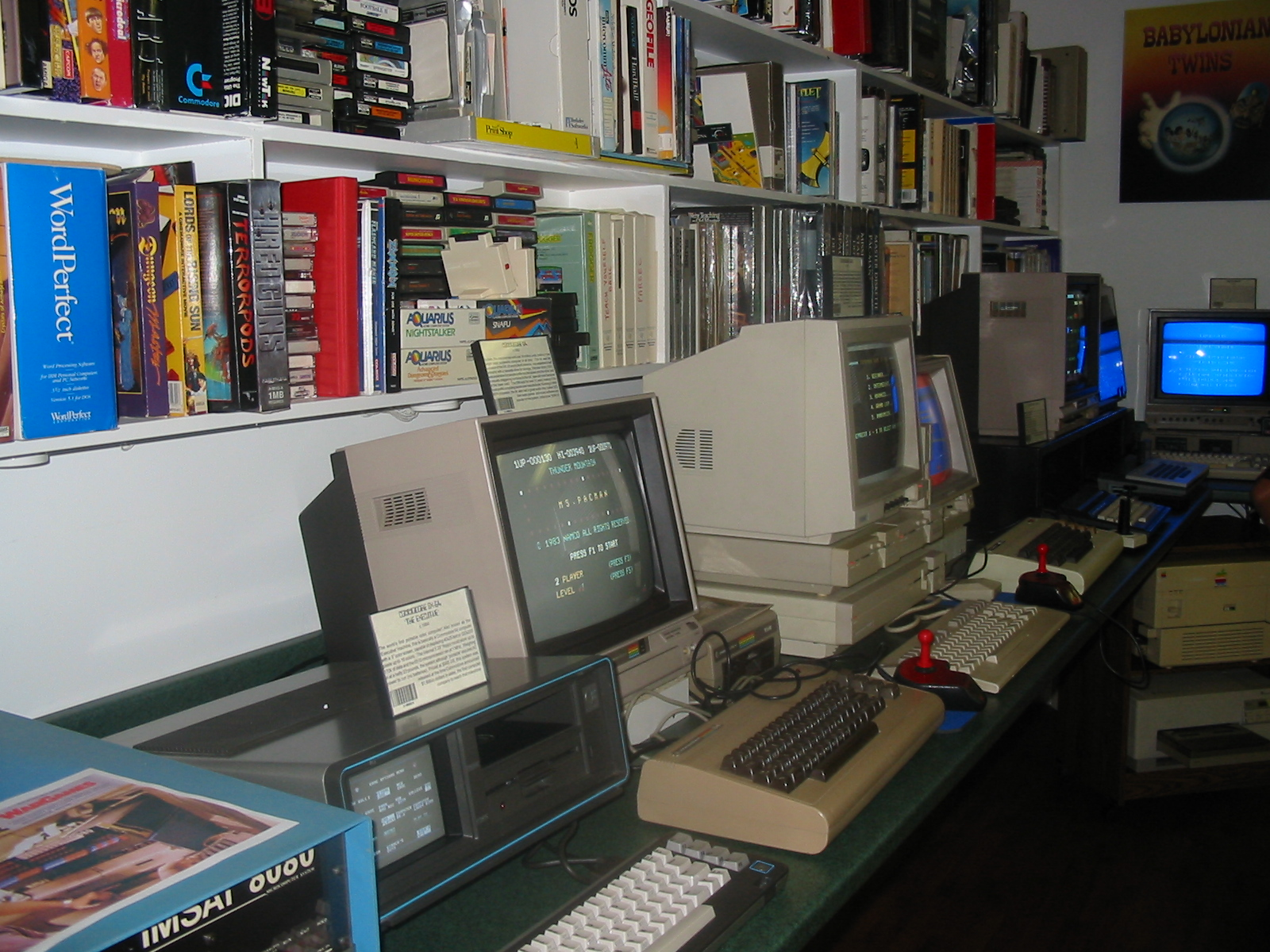
- Some personal computers on an interactive display
- Established: 2005
- Dissolved: 2018
- Location: Brantford, Ontario, Canada
- Coordinates: 43.15720°N 80.26501°W
- Type: Personal Computer museum
- Curator: Syd Bolton
- Website: http://www.pcmuseum.ca/

The Personal Computer Museum was located in Brantford, Ontario, Canada, in a building formerly owned by the municipal government. The building was built with bricks reclaimed from the Brantford Opera House.

Over fifty interactive personal computers were on display, from a wide variety of manufacturers, including Apple, Atari, Commodore, IBM, Radio Shack, Timex, Mattel, and others. The museum also had a large library of original software and a huge archive of computer-related magazines.

The museum's mandate was to preserve computer technology and, more importantly, to offer interactivity with older machines. It welcomed private tours from schools and other groups. It was open to students, to study the origins of computers and the various technologies involved. Parents were welcome to bring children, to see computers which the parents may have once used, to get a sense of the ancestry of today's technology. Admission was free.

The museum first opened to the public in September, 2005. It was run by Syd Bolton, its founder and curator, and by a group of dedicated volunteers.

In 2018, the museum closed permanently following Bolton's death. At that time, it had been open to the public only one day a month. Its contents were transferred to University of Toronto Mississauga Library in October 2020.

== Displays ==
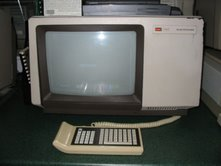
A rare example of Electrohome's Telidon terminal on display. Telidon was an early alphageometric videotex system promoted by the Canadian government but never widely deployed.

- The downstairs showcased over forty-five machines that were interactive. The most popular machines included the Commodore 64, IMSAI 8080 and Apple IIe
- Video games and consoles were also represented. One rare Atari 2600 title was an "Extra Terrestrials" cartridge published in 1983 by a small Burlington, Ontario firm unaware of Atari's similarly themed 1982 'ET' game, a massive commercial failure which was a factor in the video game crash of 1983.
- There was a 1953 Admiral Black & White television downstairs connected to a game of Pong
- The 'Tower of Power' was a 16-foot (4.9 m) high display that includes the original packaging for such machines as the Coleco Adam, Atari 2600, and Mattel Aquarius
- Upstairs contained a magazine library that had classics such as Byte Magazine and Compute!. The library was home to over 4,000 publications.
- Upstairs also had a display known as 'Modem Alley' where the history of the modem was displayed including the major milestones contributed by manufacturers such as Hayes Microcomputer Products and Supra, Inc.
- Both levels included hundreds of books on various topics in computer history
- A special section devoted to Canadian journalist and technology evangelist Jim Butterfield was on permanent display

== Computer recycling ==
The Personal Computer Museum engaged in computer recycling. Local residents would bring computers to the museum almost every Monday evening for safe, proper recycling. Computers that were still viable for redistribution were given away to needy families through the computer giveaway program. The museum also has an annual 'Spring Cleanup' event with a special focus on recycling that brought in over 400 pieces of electronics in 2008.

== Collection ==
The former museum's collection, now housed in the University of Toronto Mississauga Library (UTML), is now known as the Syd Bolton Collection. It comprises almost 14,000 video games, several hundred consoles and systems, books and literature (including over 5,000 issues of game magazines), and related technology, materials, and documents. It is the largest known collection of its kind in Canada and one of the largest in the world.

== Notable events ==
- Between June 26 and June 29, 2009 Microsoft hired the museum to fill its 'Evolution: 30 Years of Gaming' display in Toronto
- On September 13, 2008 the Personal Computer Museum held and established a new Guinness World Records attempt for the most players in a Tetris Tournament
- On March 26, 2009 the museum received a 'Shining Stars Tourism Award' for the best marketing campaign for a facility with under 30,000 visitors annually
- On June 13, 2009 the museum was host to Andy Walker, Sean Carruthers, and Matt Harris who shot an episode of LabRats.TV
- On February 20, 2010 the museum was host to the oldest known computer to send a tweet on Twitter, the VIC-20, using code written by Syd Bolton.
- On October 13, 2011 the museum received a 'Shining Stars Tourism Award' for the event "Guitar Hero Rocks the Square" and museum curator Syd Bolton received the "Tourism Innovator" award
- On November 15, 2014 Jack Livesley and former TVOntario staff, as well as the former editor of The Transactor, held a talk and Q&A session, reminiscing about the early days of Bits and Bytes and personal computers.
- On June 11, 2018 the founder and curator Syd Bolton died peacefully in a Toronto hospital after a brief illness. He was 46.

== See also ==
- Computer museum
- History of personal computers
- List of museums in Ontario and list of science museums
