= A570 =

A570 may refer to:

- Amiga A570, an external CD-ROM drive for the Amiga 500 computer
- A570 road, a primary route in northern England
- Canon PowerShot A570, a digital camera released by Canon
