= World of Commodore =

Annual expo of Commodore computers

- Status: Active
- Genre: Consumer electronics
- Country: Canada; United States; United Kingdom; Germany; Australia
- Inaugurated: 1983
- Attendance: 38,000 (1983); 42,000 (1987); 43,300 (1988); 100,000 (1992)
- Website: worldofcommodore.ca

World of Commodore is an annual computer expo dedicated to Commodore computers.

The shows were initially organized by Commodore Canada or its sister companies, and took place at the International Centre in Mississauga, Ontario, though in some years additional expos were held in the United States, Australia, or Europe. The expos were among the largest in the computing industry, with attendance at some events reaching 100,000. As with cross-industry trade shows such as CES and COMDEX, World of Commodore expos were widely reported on in computing magazines.

With the decline of its 8-bit product line and the rise of the Amiga, Commodore began branding some of the expos as World of Commodore/Amiga. The name was changed to World of Amiga following Commodore's bankruptcy in 1994 and purchase by German PC conglomerate Escom the following year. The Amiga expos continued until 2002. In 2004, the original exhibition series was revived by the Toronto PET Users Group. As of 2016 World of Commodore continues under TPUG's aegis, albeit on a scale much reduced since the expo's heyday.

== Show highlights ==
=== 1983 ===
The first World of Commodore was organized by Commodore Canada and held at the International Centre in Mississauga, Ontario from 8 to 11 December 1983. Over 70 exhibitors from around the world signed on to debut and demonstrate their Commodore-compatible software and hardware. Despite the unexpected absence of some exhibitors, the convention was a phenomenal success, with 38,000 visitors attending; attendance on the show's final day was the highest in the history of the International Centre.

The show was emceed by TVOntario's Jack Livesley, and featured seminars by Jim Butterfield and others. Exhibitors included Batteries Included; Bell Canada; Commodore Business Machines; Commodore Power/Play; Holt, Rinehart, and Winston; Koala Technologies; Micron Technology; the Toronto PET Users Group (TPUG); and The Transactor.

=== 1984 ===
World of Commodore II was held from 29 November to 2 December 1984 at the International Centre in Mississauga and attracted 41,516 visitors. Commodore held off on launching their 16-bit product line, instead concentrating their large display on the Plus/4 and Commodore 16. Speakers included David Berman and Jim Butterfield, and exhibitors included the COMAL Users' Group; Commodore Business Machines; Currah; Grolier; Holt, Rinehart, and Winston; Houghton Mifflin; Mastertronic; TPUG; The Transactor; Vaisala; and Watcom.

=== 1985 ===
The third annual World of Commodore expo was held at the International Centre in Mississauga from 5 to 8 December 1985. The show was notable for three major product launches by Commodore: the Commodore 128, Amiga, and the PC-10 and PC-20 IBM PC-compatible systems.

The expo also hosted the usual slate of seminars, with presentations by Commodore, Digital Solutions, TPUG, Jim Butterfield, Steve Punter, and others. Industry exhibitors included Abacus Software, Ahoy!, Commodore Business Machines, Digital Solutions, Electronic Arts, Gold Disk, Grolier, McGraw-Hill Ryerson, TPUG, Watcom, and WordPro distributor Norland Agencies.

=== 1986 ===
The fourth World of Commodore was held the first week of December 1986 at the International Centre in Mississauga. All major Amiga software companies were present, with the notable exception of game developers such as Electronic Arts. Hardware developers and vendors were out in force, with Mimetics demoing a Deluxe Music Construction Set–compatible MIDI sequencer, and Xetec presenting its SCSI interfaces and hard drives. Commodore itself used the show to launch its Amiga Sidecar and to announce its forthcoming genlock card.

The computing press was represented by The Transactor, Amiga World, and RUN. Notable personages in attendance included author Jim Butterfield, Commodore engineer Dave Haynie, and sysops from Commodore-related forums on The Source and CompuServe.

=== 1987 ===
World of Commodore 1987 was held at the International Centre in Mississauga. There were over 85 exhibitors, including TPUG, Ahoy!, Electronic Arts, The Transactor, NewTek, Supra, Inc., Gold Disk, Xetec, and Commodore itself. The show's major focus was on the Amiga 1000, Amiga 500, and Amiga 2000, with comparatively few offerings for Commodore's 8-bit and PC-compatible lines.

Commodore demoed the A2300 Genlock and the PVA, two new genlock cards for the Amiga 2000, and announced two new PC-compatible systems: the PC 10-III, a 9.54 MHz XT clone, and the PC-60, a 386-based machine running XENIX. New productivity software exhibited at the show included Berkeley Softworks's geoPublish, Electronic Arts's PaperClip III and Mavis Beacon Teaches Typing, and NewTek's Video Toaster. New games for the Commodore 64 and 128 came mostly from Electronic Arts, and included Halls of Montezuma, Bard's Tale III, Skyfox II, Strike Fleet, and Skate or Die. New Amiga software demoed or announced included Arkanoid, Bard's Tale II, Reach for the Stars, Thexder, Space Quest II, Police Quest, The Hunt for Red October, and WordPerfect.

Seminars were presented by Jim Butterfield, Steve Punter, Fred Fish, and others. The expo achieved record attendance of 42,000.

=== 1988 ===
1988 marked the first time that two World of Commodore expos were held: one in November at the Philadelphia Civic Center, and the other in December in Toronto.

Attendance at the Toronto expo was over 43,300, surpassing the record set the previous year. As in 1987, the Amiga dominated all aspects of the show. Exhibitors included Ion Publishing, publishers of Ahoy! and AmigaUser.

In September, 1988 a World Of Commodore expo was held at the newly opened Sydney Convention and Exhibition Centre, Darling Harbour, Sydney, Australia.

=== 1989 ===
Three World of Commodore shows were held in 1989: the original Canadian edition was held from 30 November to 4 December in Toronto, an American East Coast edition was held from 22 to 24 September in Valley Forge, Pennsylvania, and an American West Coast edition took place at the Los Angeles Convention Center from 19 to 21 May.

The Los Angeles show saw exhibits and announcements from Commodore, NewTek, MicroIllusions, Xetec, Amiga World, and Canon Inc.

=== 1990 ===
Beginning in 1990, the expo was rebranded World of Commodore Amiga. The show was noted for Commodore's announcement and early demo of the Commodore CDTV. Third-party exhibitors included Walt Disney Computer Software, Amazing Computing, RUN, Xetec, Abacus, Creative Micro Designs, Gold Disk, Sierra On-Line, Kawai Musical Instruments, and COMPUTE! Publications.

=== 1991 ===
A World of Commodore was held at Earls Court Exhibition Centre in London from 14 to 17 November 1991, and a World of Commodore Amiga took place at the Sydney Convention and Exhibition Centre in Australia from 12 to 14 July 1991. At these shows Commodore launched its CDTV multimedia platform. The London show was supported by companies such as Electronic Arts, Psygnosis, and Ocean.

=== 1992 ===
A World of Commodore was held from 3 to 5 July 1992 at the Sydney Convention and Exhibition Centre, Darling Harbour, Sydney, Australia.

World of Commodore 1992 was held in Pasadena, California in September 1992; attendance was estimated at nearly 20,000. Commodore used the event to introduce the Amiga 4000, the Amiga 600 and Amiga 600HD, AmigaDOS 3.0, and the A570 CD-ROM drive for the Amiga 500. Commodore also presented "Father of the Amiga" Jay Miner with one of the first Amiga 4000s. Third-party exhibitors releasing and demonstrating new products included SAS Institute, Scala, Inc., Gold Disk, and Digital Creations.

A World of Commodore/Amiga 1992 took place at the Frankfurt Trade Fair grounds in Frankfurt am Main, Germany from 26 to 29 November 1992. The expo was colocated with the Amiga '92 show; there were around 150 exhibitors and visitor attendance was expected to reach 100,000. Though the expo included a special anniversary celebration for the Commodore 64, only a very small minority of exhibitors and visitors were 8-bit computer users.

=== 1993 ===
World of Commodore and World of Commodore/Amiga expos were held in several locations in 1993, including New York City; Sydney, Australia; Pasadena, California; Cologne, Germany; and Mississauga, Ontario.

The New York show was well attended and featured 30 exhibitors, many of which were mail order companies. Commodore displayed a prototype of its new Amiga 4000 tower model, and wowed visitors with a demonstration of full-screen 30 FPS MPEG video on a stock Amiga 4000/030.

The Australian expo featured exhibits by Amazing Computing, Amiga Format, Commodore, and Mindscape.

At the Pasadena show, Commodore US President Jim Dionne outlined his plans for Amiga CD32 sales to bring the company back into profit. Commodore also announced the impending release of AmigaDOS 3.1, the aforementioned Amiga 4000 tower model, and CD32-compatible CD-ROM drives for the Amiga 4000 and Amiga 1200.

The World of Commodore in Cologne took place from 5 to 7 November 1993. It featured over 150 companies and had a Saturday attendance of over 50,000. Contrary to expectations, Commodore did not launch the Amiga 4000 tower model, but heavily promoted the CD32 with about 60 demonstrator models. The highlight of the show was COME Corporate Media's Photo CD system.

=== 1995 ===
Commodore declared bankruptcy in 1994, and the following year its assets were purchased by the German PC conglomerate Escom. Escom took over organization of the World of Commodore exhibitions, rebranding them World of Amiga. Its first World of Amiga expo was held at the International Centre in Mississauga in December 1995. The show featured Escom's new subsidiary Amiga Technologies, as well as 30 other hardware and software exhibitors. The show was criticized for exhibitors' focus on sales rather than demonstrations and product launches. Among the few new products released was Idruna Software's Photogenics.

=== 2004 ===
In 2004, the defunct World of Commodore expo was revived by the Toronto PET Users Group. The event was held at the Belaire Hotel in Toronto on 4 December, and featured talks and demos by Jim Butterfield, Jim Brain, Jeri Ellsworth, former Transactor editor Karl J. H. Hildon, Commodore Canada vice president Ron Anderson, and a representative of Commodore trademark holders Tulip Computers.

=== 2006 ===
World of Commodore 2006 was held at the Alderwood United Church in Toronto on 2 December. It featured screenings of the TVOntario series Bits and Bytes, a guest talk by C64 Direct-to-TV designer Jeri Ellsworth, and the final World of Commodore appearance by author Jim Butterfield. Though attendance was just 75, the expo attracted coverage from news outlets such as The Globe and Mail and The Toronto Star.

=== 2007 ===
Toronto's Alderwood United Church was the venue for TPUG's World of Commodore 2007. The event, held on 1 December 2007, featured several tributes to Commodore pioneer Jim Butterfield, who had died of cancer earlier that year.

=== 2012 ===
World of Commodore 2012 was organized by TPUG and held at the Admiral Inn in Mississauga, Ontario on 1 December 2012. Independent game developer Comma 8 Studios announced M.U.L.E. Returns, a licensed remake of the 1983 classic M.U.L.E. slated for release in 2013.

=== 2013 ===
World of Commodore 2013 was organized by TPUG and held at the Admiral Inn in Mississauga, Ontario on 7 December. The event hosted Comma 8 Studios's launch of M.U.L.E. Returns, the iOS remake of M.U.L.E. which had been announced at the previous World of Commodore expo.

== Timeline ==
Name	Date	Venue	Notes
World of Commodore	8–11 December 1983	International Centre, Mississauga, Ontario	
World of Commodore II	29 November–2 December 1984	International Centre, Mississauga, Ontario	
World of Commodore III	5–8 December 1985	International Centre, Mississauga, Ontario	
World of Commodore IV	4–7 December 1986	International Centre, Mississauga, Ontario	
World of Commodore V	December 1987	International Centre, Mississauga, Ontario	
World of Commodore 1988 (US)	3 November 1988	Philadelphia Convention Center, Philadelphia, Pennsylvania	
World of Commodore 1988	1 December 1988	Toronto, Ontario	
World of Commodore 1989 (US West Coast)	19–21 May 1989	Los Angeles Convention Center, Los Angeles, California	
World of Commodore 1989 (US East Coast)	22–24 September 1989	Valley Forge, Pennsylvania	
World of Commodore 1989	30 November–4 December 1989	International Centre, Mississauga, Ontario	
World of Commodore Amiga 1990	30 November–2 December 1990	International Centre, Mississauga, Ontario	
World of Commodore 1991	14–17 November 1991	Earls Court Exhibition Centre, London, United Kingdom	
World of Commodore Amiga 1991	12–14 July 1991	Sydney Convention and Exhibition Centre, Sydney, Australia	
World of Commodore 1992	3–5 July 1992	Sydney Convention and Exhibition Centre, Sydney, Australia	
World of Commodore 1992 (US)	10–13 September 1992	Pasadena, California	
World of Commodore/Amiga 1992	26–29 November 1992	Messe Frankfurt, Frankfurt am Main, Germany	
World of Commodore 1992	1992	International Centre, Mississauga, Ontario	
World of Commodore/Amiga 1993 (US)	24–26 April 1993	Pier 88, New York Passenger Ship Terminal, New York, New York	
World of Commodore/Amiga 1993 (Australia)	2–4 July 1993	Darling Harbour, Sydney, Australia	
World of Commodore 1993 (US)	10–13 September 1993	Pasadena, California	
World of Commodore 1993	3–5 November 1993	International Centre, Mississauga, Ontario	
World of Commodore 1993 (Germany)	5–7 November 1993	Cologne, Germany	
World of Amiga Toronto 1995	8–10 December 1995	International Centre, Mississauga, Ontario	
World of Commodore 2004	3–5 December 2004	Belaire Hotel, Toronto, Ontario	
World of Commodore 2005	3 December 2005	Alderwood United Church, Toronto, Ontario	
World of Commodore 2006	2 December 2006	Alderwood United Church, Toronto, Ontario	
World of Commodore 2007	1 December 2007	Alderwood United Church, Toronto, Ontario	
World of Commodore 2008	6 December 2008	Alderwood United Church, Toronto, Ontario	
World of Commodore 2009	5 December 2009	Toronto, Ontario	
World of Commodore 2010	4 December 2010	Holiday Inn, Mississauga, Ontario	
World of Commodore 2011	3 December 2011	Admiral Inn, Mississauga, Ontario	
World of Commodore 2012	1 December 2012	Admiral Inn, Mississauga, Ontario	
World of Commodore 2013	7 December 2013	Admiral Inn, Mississauga, Ontario	
World of Commodore 2014	6 December 2014	Admiral Inn, Mississauga, Ontario	
World of Commodore 2015	5 December 2015	Admiral Inn, Mississauga, Ontario	
World of Commodore 2016	3–4 December 2016	Admiral Inn, Mississauga, Ontario	
