= Nightcap (1963 TV program) =

- Genre: Variety show; Comedy
- Written by: Chris Beard
- Directed by: Terry Kyne
- Starring: Guido Basso; Alan Hamel; Billy Van
- Country of origin: Canada
- Original language: English
- No. of seasons: 4

Production
- Producer: Terry Kyne

Original release
- Network: CBC Television
- Release: 2 October 1963 – 31 May 1967

Nightcap is a Canadian late-night comedy and variety television program that aired on CBC Television from 1963 to 1967.

== Premise ==
This series featured satire and music sketches on topical issues in the news and society with regular performers Bonnie Brooks, Jean Christopher (until 1965), Alan Hamel, Vanda King (after 1965), June Sampson and Billy Van. The Rubber Band was the series' musical quintet, featuring Guido Basso who often performed in segments with the other regulars. The series also featured interviews, serious and not, with famous guests as well as a soap opera parody, "Flemingdon Park", "A cesspool of desire in the heart of suburbia", named after a suburban Toronto neighbourhood. Flemingdon Park was spun-off as a six-part television series in 1967.

== Scheduling ==
This approximately hour-long program was broadcast 39 weeks a year on Wednesdays at approximately 11:37 p.m. (Eastern) from 2 October 1963 to 16 June 1965. The time slot was moved to Tuesdays at 11:41 p.m. from 5 October 1965 to 28 June 1966. The time slot was returned to late Wednesday nights, 11:45 p.m. for its final season from 19 October 1966 to 31 May 1967.

Initially, the broadcasts were confined to Toronto and other Ontario cities such as Barrie, London and Windsor. By 1966, the series could be seen in Montreal, Ottawa, Pembroke, Quebec City and Vancouver.

== Reception ==
Montreal Gazette television critic Bernard Dubé described the series as "wild, corny, raunchy, lively and irreverent". Roy Shields, a Toronto columnist, panned the series as "the worst TV show in the world."
