= Tie Break (video game) =

1990 video game

- Developer: Starbyte Software
- Publishers: GER: Starbyte Software; EU: Ocean Software; NA: DigiTek Software
- Platforms: Amiga, Atari ST, MS-DOS, Amstrad CPC, Commodore 64, Commodore CDTV, ZX Spectrum
- Release: 1990
- Genre: Sports
- Modes: Single-player, multiplayer

Tie Break is a 1990 tennis video game developed and published by Starbyte Software for the Amiga. Ports for other home computers were released later. The game is known as Adidas Championship Tie Break on the ZX Spectrum.

== Gameplay ==
The game is depicted from an overhead view. The game is controlled entirely by the joystick, buttons are not used. The game supports simultaneous four-player multiplayer with four joysticks. There are two modes to choose from: practise and tournament. The selected tournament (Wimbledon, US Open, etc.) determines the court surface (grass, clay, etc.).

== Reception ==
Reception

Review scores
| Publication | Score |
|---|---|
| Aktueller Software Markt | 10/12 (Amiga, C64, CDTV) |
| Amiga Format | 84% (Amiga) |
| ST Format | 83% (ST) |
| The Games Machine (UK) | 76% (Amiga) |
| Your Sinclair | 79% (ZX) |
| Zero | 78% (Amiga) |
| Amstar | 15/20 (CPC) |

Amiga Format called the game "an impressive-looking and polished tennis simulation". Zero didn't like the overhead view because the player can see only three quarters of the court, the reviewer concluded: "This strange perspective combined with a really dodgy soundtrack means that despite some good features Tie Break doesn't quite make the grade." The Games Machine said: "The two- and four-player modes make up for the overly tough computer opponents and are where the fun's at" ST Format said: "The programmers have stuck to the essentials, ignored all frippery and created an excellent game with lasting appeal." Your Sinclair called it "a neatly put-together and enjoyable game."
