= The Case of the Cautious Condor =

- Developer: Tiger Media
- Platforms: FM Towns, CDTV, MS-DOS
- Release: 1989: FM Towns; 1991: CDTV; 1992: MS-DOS
- Genre: Adventure

The Case of the Cautious Condor is an adventure video game in an interactive comic book style developed by Tiger Media. It was first released for FM Towns in Japan in 1989, then for CDTV in 1991 and MS-DOS in 1992. The game has no text: the dialogue is played only as audio.

Tiger Media later released a similar game, entitled Murder Makes Strange Deadfellows.

== Plot ==
The player controls detective Ned Peters, who has to figure out the identity of the murderer by wandering around the rooms, looking for clues and overhearing conversations between the other guests aboard the flying boat Condor on a cruise over the Atlantic.

== Reception ==
Computer Gaming World in 1993 wrote that "though the story was manufactured in the Orient Express Murder Mystery machine, this interactive comic book is novel enough to warrant a serious look ... A multimedia diversion for the whole family".

According to the game's developer, it had disappointing sales, in part because CD-ROM drives were not yet widespread at that time.

== See also ==
- The Last Express
- Murder on the Zinderneuf
