= M.U.L.E. Returns =

2013 video game

- M.U.L.E. Returns logo
- Developer: Comma 8 Studios
- Designer: Dani Bunten
- Platforms: iOS, Android
- Release: 25 November 2013 (iOS)
- Genre: Turn-based strategy
- Mode: Single-player

M.U.L.E. Returns was a strategy mobile game by Toronto-based developer Comma 8 Studios. It was a licensed iOS remake of the 1983 classic M.U.L.E.

== Gameplay ==
The gameplay of M.U.L.E. Returns closely follows that of the original M.U.L.E., though the controls are adapted for mobile device touchscreens. Improvements over the original include a pause feature, three difficulty modes, social media integration, and the ability to apply custom skins.

== Development ==
In 2012, Electronic Arts was in licensing negotiations with M.U.L.E.'s original developers, Ozark Softscape, though these were unsuccessful and Ozark ultimately awarded mobile platform rights to Comma 8 Studios. Comma 8 began developing the game simultaneously for iOS and Android, using C++ and a framework middleware. To create as faithful a reproduction as possible, the developers traced and reimplemented the original 8-bit code.

== Release ==
Comma 8 released an official trailer for the game on 27 June 2012, and discussed the game's development at World of Commodore 2012 in December. The game was originally slated to be released in mid-2012, though this was pushed back repeatedly, first to the end of the year, then to early 2013, and finally to late 2013. The game was eventually released for iOS on 25 November 2013 and was presented the following week at the 2013 World of Commodore in Toronto. However, as of 16 February 2019 further development on the game has been discontinued.

== Reception ==
Reception

Aggregate score
Aggregator	Score
GameRankings	53% (based on 3 reviews)

Review score
Publication	Score
148Apps	4/5

Reviewers' attitudes to M.U.L.E. Returns were split. Matt Thrower of Gamezebo appreciated the game's "unique and enthralling mixture of strategic concerns propelled forward by real-time pressures" but criticized its patchy tutorial, sloppy artificial intelligence, and showstopping bugs. Pocket Gamer's Harry Slater, who is not a fan of the original M.U.L.E., criticized the remake as "outdated, with sloppy touch controls and far-from impressive backdrops". 148Apps had a more positive opinion of the game, awarding it four out of five stars and praising its sophisticated supply-and-demand economics. Like Gamezebo, however, they bemoaned its failure to implement the original's multiplayer mode.
