= Rhinoceros Party of Canada candidates in the 1980 Canadian federal election =

The first and original Rhinoceros Party of Canada fielded 116 candidates in the 1980 Canadian federal election, none of whom were elected. Two candidates finished second. One finished third. Some who finished fourth beat the New Democratic Party (NDP), and are mentioned. Others who placed fourth beat Social Credit Party of Canada (Social Credit). In some cases, there were only four candidates on the ballot, in others there was a wide field of fringe parties.

== Alberta ==
All Alberta Rhino candidates but one —Carl Hohol in Vegreville— came in fourth, for a number of reasons. The candidates (with electoral districts) and number of votes received were:

- Samoil, Willy (Calgary Centre) 766 votes
- Pazdor, Philip J. (Calgary East) 638 votes
- Williams, Mike (Calgary North) 878 votes
- Lambe, David E. Fred (Calgary South) 887 votes
- Petti, Anthony G. (Calgary West) 1,027 votes
- Walker, Dave (Edmonton Strathcona) 453 votes
- Cavanagh, Allan G. W. (Peace River) 547 votes
- Hohol, Carl M. (Vegreville) 359 votes

== British Columbia ==
B.C. Rhino candidates generally ran against a wide field of minority parties and independent candidates. They placed fourth in all but one riding contested: Esquimalt—Saanich with Bob Maddocks standing. The candidates (with electoral districts) and number of votes received were:

- Schaller, Richard the Troll (Capilano) 688 votes
- Lesosky, Louis Crowbird (Cowichan—Malahat—The Islands) 444 votes
- Maddocks, Bob (Esquimalt—Saanich) 548 votes
- Storey, Kyle (Kamloops-Shuswap) 237 votes
- Coffey, Frank Tee Pee Red (Nanaimo-Alberni) 591 votes
- Kruger, Andre The Rock (Okanagan-Similkameen) 317 votes
- Courchene, Albert The Cad (Surrey-White Rock-North Delta) 440 votes
- Longworth, David J. (Vancouver Centre) 337 votes
- Lyttle, Dandy Randy (Vancouver East) 198 votes
- McDonald, Verne John Eh (Vancouver Quadra) 405 votes
- Fleming, Linda (Vancouver South) 327 votes
- Higgins, Rhino Kirk (Victoria) 446 votes

== Manitoba ==
Manitoban Rhino candidates were generally uncontested for fourth, in which place all four shown below finished. The candidates (with electoral districts) and number of votes received were:

- Campbell, Roland (at the time Churchill; now Churchill—Keewatinook Aski) 352 votes
- Feilburg, Lawrence (Provencher) 433 votes
- Bergen, Honest Don (Winnipeg—Birds Hill) 322 votes
- Balderstone, Smilin Dave (Winnipeg—Fort Garry) 405 votes

== New Brunswick ==
The candidates (with electoral districts) and number of votes received were:

- Both candidates in Gloucester combined, with Boudreau ranking fourth in his own right.
  - Boucher, Amede Le Terrible (then Gloucester, now Acadie—Bathurst in 1990) 362 votes
  - Boudreau, Jules Cesar (at the time Gloucester, later renamed Acadie—Bathurst) 736 votes.
- Doucet, Arthur (Restigouche) 692 votes; finished in fourth rank.

== Nova Scotia ==
Both NS Rhino candidates finished in fourth place. They were (with electoral districts) and number of votes received:

- Moors, Mark (then, Annapolis Valley—Hants now, Kings—Hants) 343 votes
- Tudor, Martha (at that time, South Shore, later South Shore—St. Margarets) 433 votes

== Ontario ==
The candidates (with electoral districts) and number of votes received were:

- Reid, David J. (Beaches) 214 votes
- Butterfield, Vicki (Broadview—Greenwood at the time, now called Toronto—Danforth)

Butterfield, wife of noted computer expert Jim Butterfield, ran a low-profile campaign. The Rhinoceros Party announced that she was "following the lead of another, more prominent candidate, and is hiding from the public". This was likely a reference to Liberal Party leader Pierre Trudeau. She received 196 votes (0.61%), finishing fourth against New Democratic Party incumbent Bob Rae.

- Wright, Douglas (Kitchener) 292 votes
- Elson, Mark (Peterborough, now Peterborough—Kawartha) 243 votes
- Pileggi, Salvatore (Spadina) 146 votes
- Armour, Liza (St. Paul's) 311 votes
- Matheson, John (York East) 237 votes

The following candidates all finished fourth:

- Thorning, Steve (Guelph) 272 votes
- Sabzali, James E. S. (Hamilton West) 304 votes
- Sharp, Edward T. (Kingston and the Islands) 373 votes
- Showers, Stewart (London West) 224 votes
- Cockerell, Alan (Nepean—Carleton) 658 votes
- Stranart, J. C. (Ontario) 313 votes
- Langille, David (Ottawa Centre) 358 votes
- Ashby, Graham Prickes (Ottawa-Vanier) 519 votes
- Yates, Geoff (in 1980, Rosedale; now Toronto Centre) 319 votes
- Douglas, John (Spadina) 250 votes
- Lake, Fred Horny (St. Catharines) 230 votes
- Lalonde, Raymond (Sudbury) 288 votes
- Nigol, Rick (Waterloo) 330 votes
- Oliver, Mark (York-Peel) 589 votes

== Québec ==
The candidates (with electoral districts) and number of votes received were:

- Des Gagne, Ti-Pit Claude (Berthier—Maskinongé) 728 votes — finished third behind the Liberals and the Progressive Conservatives (PC Party). NDP did not run a candidate.
- Grenier, Philippe Sarto (Blainville—Deux-Montagnes) 1,685 votes
- Leblanc, Louis Philippe Tulipe (Bonaventure-Iles-De-La-Madeleine) 917 votes
- Laliberté, Guy Pantouffe (Charlevoix) 945 votes. Guy Laliberté later went on to found Cirque de Soleil.
- Cote, Sonia Chatouille (Laurier) 3,067 votes — finished second, beating the Progressive Conservative Party of Canada (PC Party) and the NDP.
- Richard, Gervais Prime (Lévis) 2,652 votes
- Brunet, Jean-Marc Cornelius (at the time, Longueuil; now, Longueuil—Saint-Hubert) 2,631 votes
- Regimbauld, Paul (Lotbiniere) 3,041 votes
- Gavroche, Gosselin D. (Megantic-Compton-Stanstead) 1,002 votes
- De Blois, Piggy Guy (Mercier) 1,835 votes
- Paquette, J. Chretin (at that time, Portneuf; now Portneuf—Jacques-Cartier) 1,634 votes
- Pollender, Raymond Patrotrovitch (Québec-Est) 1,862 votes
- Moreau, Helene (then Richelieu, now Bécancour—Nicolet—Saurel) 1,215 votes
- Caron, Denys (Richmond) 876 votes
- Saintonge, Jacques (Rimouski) 627 votes
- Simard, Donald Bobette (Roberval) 503 votes
- Arene, Jean-Luc (Saint-Jean) 982 votes
- Bedard, Fernand (Sherbrooke) 909 votes
- Massicotte, Michel Celestin (Temiscamingue, now reconstituted as Abitibi—Témiscamingue) 1,206 votes
- Drapeau, Pedro Gervais G. D. (Terrebonne) 1,844 votes
- De Vernal, J. F. Le Calife (Saint-Maurice) 1,206 votes
- Chaput, Benoit Yodepech (Saint-Michel) 1,603 votes
- Chamberland, Andre (Saint-Hyacinthe) 868 votes

These candidates all placed fourth in their races:

- Lambert, Germain (Beauce) 624 votes; finished in fourth place, beating the NDP (who received 404 votes)
- Chabot, Andree (Bellechasse) 815 votes; finished fourth, beating the NDP (730 votes)
- Michaud, Helene (Chambly) 1,724 votes
- Bernard, Denis Van (Charlesbourg, now Charlesbourg—Haute-Saint-Charles) 3,066 votes
- Vaillancourt, Pierre Elliot (Duvernay) 2,479 votes
- Antonyszyn, Polack Eugene (Gamelin) 1,640 votes
- Mainville, Francis Vitesse (Gaspe) 759 votes
- Penzes, Francois R. (Gatineau) 640 votes
- Gougeon, Diane (Hochelaga-Maisonneuve) 1,412 votes
- Dompierre, Sylvain (formerly Hull, now Hull—Aylmer) 598 votes
- In Kamouraska—Rivière-du-Loup, the combined vote of the two candidates was enough for them to rank fourth:
  - Guay, Raymond (Kamouraska—Rivière-du-Loup) 349 votes
  - Lapierre, Andre Constance (Kamouraska—Rivière-du-Loup) 358 votes
- In Labelle, the combined vote of the three candidates was enough to rank fourth:
  - Collin, Gaston (Labelle) 664 votes
  - Gagnon, Richard Amouthd (Labelle) 331 votes
  - Morin, Jean-Marie (Labelle) 580 votes
- Briand, Beru Louis (Lac-Saint-Jean) 1,159 votes
- Baribeau, Jean Serge (Lachine) 692 votes
- Lefebvre, Jean Obelix (at the time, Langelier; now Québec) 2,813 votes; finished second, beating the New Democratic Party (NDP) candidate.
- Ferron, Jacques (La Prairie) 1,868 votes. Jacques Ferron (1921–1985), physician and author, was a decorated Québec cultural hero.
- Bonnier, Jean Chat Botte (Laval) 1,679 votes
- Bonnier, Alain Bugs (Laval-Des-Rapides) 2,152 votes
- Ouellet, François (Louis-Hebert) 3,795 votes
- The combined vote of the two candidates in Manicouagan was enough for them to rank fourth, but not enough to beat the NDP.
  - Bedard, Denis Tarzan (Manicouagan) 715 votes
  - Truchon, Yves (Manicouagan) 841 votes
- Belair, Michel (Matapedia-Matane) 892 votes; finished fourth, beating the NDP by four votes.
- Gingras, Pierre Screwdriver (Missisquoi) 687 votes
- Theriault, Face-Bleme Jacques (Montmorency) 1,913 votes
- Rivard, Michel Flybin (Mount Royal) 715 votes
- Roy, Cherubin Guy (Notre-Dame-de-Grâce) 900 votes
- Langlois, Philippe (Outremont) 2,065 votes
- Beauregard, Gaston Lagaffe (Pontiac-Gatineau-Labelle) 643 votes
- Harvey, La Mule Louis (at the time, Rosemont, since renamed Papineau) 1,608 votes
- Tremblay, G. Mara (then, Rosemont; now Rosemont—La Petite-Patrie) 1,310 votes
- Rose, Serge (Saint-Denis) 1,232 votes
- Montpetit, Jean-Guy (Saint-Henri-Westmount) 1,140 votes
- Tremblay, Rodrigue Chocolat (Saint Jacques) 1,080 votes
- Guzzo-Ceros (Saint-Leonard-Anjou) 1,569 votes
- Favreau, Francois Straight (Sainte-Marie) 1,659 votes
- Brazeau, Cornelius Andre (Shefford) 1,274 votes
- Mignault, Hughe Le Brulot (Vercheres) 2,804 votes
- Cawthorn, Ronald (Verdun) 1,141 votes

== Saskatchewan ==
Both Rhino candidates in Saskatchewan ranked fourth in their races and are shown (with electoral districts) and number of votes received:

- Bowden, Ross Dunning (Kindersley-Lloydminster) 294 votes
- Hoover, Derron H. X. (Regina East) 302 votes
