= Toronto PET Users Group =

- Abbreviation: TPUG
- Formation: 1978
- Founder: Lyman Duggan
- Type: Users' group
- Location: Toronto, Ontario, Canada
- Website: tpug.ca
- Formerly called: CLUB 2001

The Toronto PET Users Group is one of the world's oldest extant computer user groups, and was among the very largest. The non-profit group is based in Toronto but has an international membership. It supports nearly all Commodore computers, including the PET, VIC-20, Commodore 64, Commodore 128, Plus/4, Commodore 16, Commodore 65, and Amiga, including the COMAL programming language and the CP/M and GEOS environments. TPUG is noted for its ties with Commodore Canada, its extensive and widely distributed software library, and its association with prominent computing pioneers such as Jim Butterfield, Brad Templeton, Karl Hildon, and Steve Punter.

== History ==
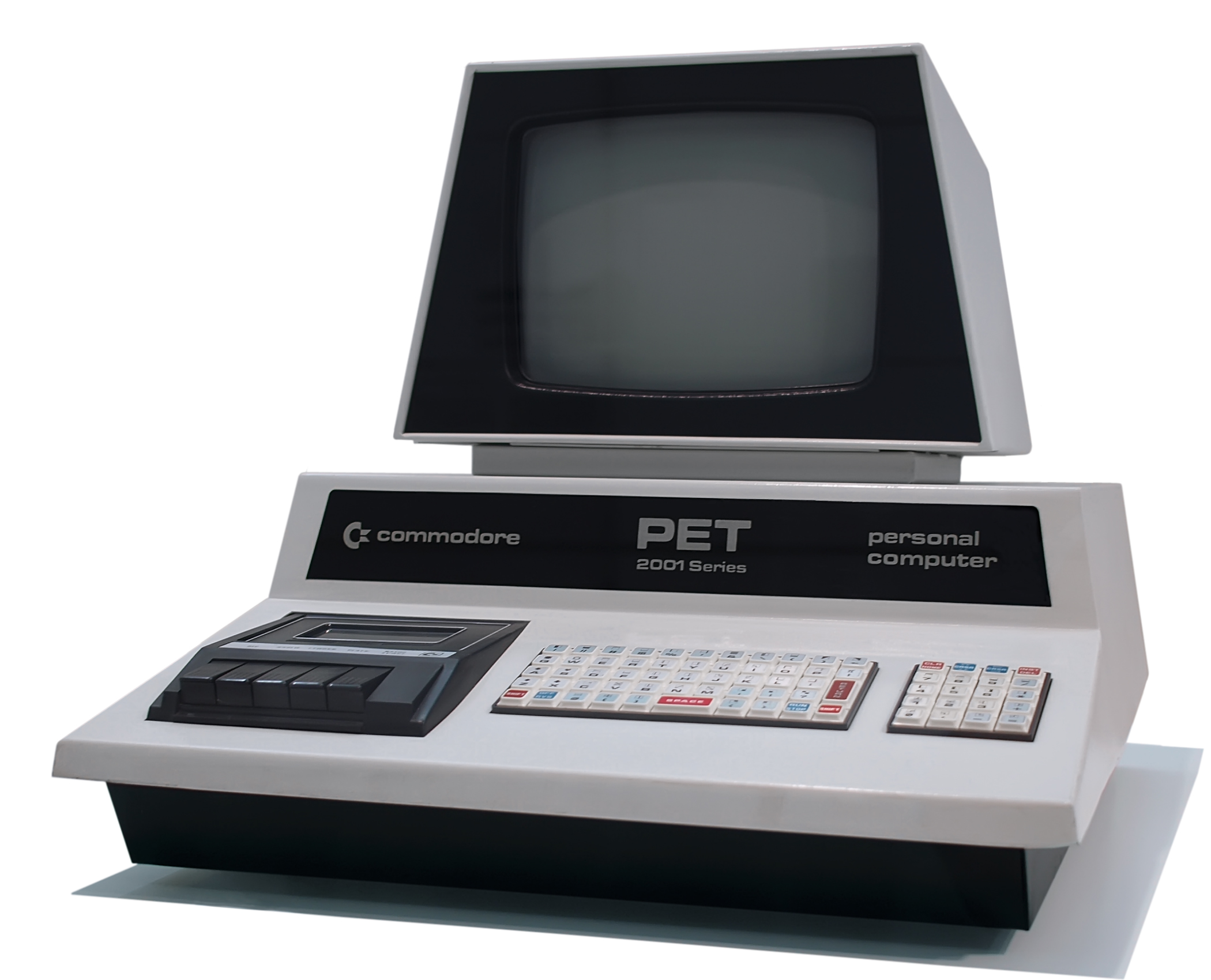
Commodore PET 2001

TPUG was founded in 1978 or 1979 by Lyman Duggan, a Toronto-area resident who had recently bought a Commodore PET 2001 but could not find an existing user group with any PET owners. At the urging of local author and programmer Jim Butterfield, Duggan organized his own PET group—then known as CLUB 2001—and advertised it by word of mouth. The first meeting was held in the party room of Duggan's condominium, with Butterfield as the invited speaker. Some 35 people showed up. Attendance at subsequent meetings grew rapidly, leading Duggan to shift them to ever-larger venues—first to the Ontario Science Centre and later to a theatre at Sheridan College.

When Duggan was unexpectedly transferred by his employer to Florida in 1980, he nominated a board of directors to replace him, and TPUG was transformed from a privately run enterprise into a members' club. By 1982 it had over 2000 members, with 40 more signing up each week, and a magazine circulation of 3000. The club reached its peak in the mid-1980s, with membership figures variously reported between 15,000 and 22,000. It thus became one of the largest and longest-running user groups in the world. The club's scope grew to include other Commodore computers, with dedicated chapters for the PET, VIC-20, Commodore 64, Commodore 128, and Amiga. TPUG held over a hundred chapter meetings each year, with attendance at the largest ones reaching about 700.

== Operations ==
In the 1980s TPUG employed a full-time staff to process memberships and to operate its software library and magazine publishing operations. The club became a central clearing house for freeware for the PET, VIC-20, C64, and other Commodore 8-bit computers. Disks and tapes were distributed by mail to a network of associated Commodore user groups across North America and around the world. Jim Butterfield authored much of the original TPUG software library and he continued to distribute new programs through the club. As of 2009 the software library was still maintained, and has been released in its entirety on CD-ROM, though there is little demand for titles for the very oldest machines.

TPUG's publishing arm produced a number of print periodicals for internal and external distribution, including the standalone journals TPUG Magazine (1984–1986) and TPUG Newsletter (1988–), as well as TPUG News (1987–1988) which was distributed as an insert in Karl Hildon's magazine The Transactor. An earlier club magazine, The TORPET, was produced independently under commercial contract from 1980. In 1984 its owner, Bruce Beach, dissociated the publication from TPUG and relaunched it as an oceanography journal.

TPUG was regularly involved in Commodore Canada's annual World of Commodore computer expos since their launch in 1983. The early Toronto-based shows saw attendance of around 40,000, but the series became moribund some years after Commodore's demise in 1994. In 2004 TPUG revived the World of Commodore shows, which as of 2014 continue under their aegis, albeit on a much reduced scale.

In its early decades, the club kept in touch with members and associates around the world through its dial-up bulletin board system, which was programmed and operated by Steve Punter and Sylvia Gallus. TPUG also maintained a presence on private online services of the day and eventually the Internet and World Wide Web. In the 2000s the club set up a special web server running on a Commodore 64, and within a week it had received hits from thousands of other Commodore machines.

== Current activities ==
Though membership has dwindled, TPUG continues to hold monthly meetings where 12 to 15 attending members trade software, share hacking tips, and troubleshoot old hardware. The club continues to organize the annual World of Commodore expo in Toronto, with attendance figures around 100.

On 20 January 2013, the club staged a flash mob at Starbucks to celebrate the 30-year anniversary of the Commodore SX-64 portable computer. The publicity generated led to Starbucks Corporation approaching TPUG to recreate the event for a promotional documentary film. The short film, which shows club members invading a Kipling Starbucks with PETs, SX-64s, and other antique computers, was released by the corporation in October 2014 as part of its "Meet Me At Starbucks" series.

On 9 September 2025, TPUG has announced a magazine comeback.

== Notable members ==
- Syd Bolton
- Jim Butterfield
- Karl Hildon
- Steve Punter
- Brad Templeton
