= Jim Butterfield =

Canadian computer programmer (1936–2007)

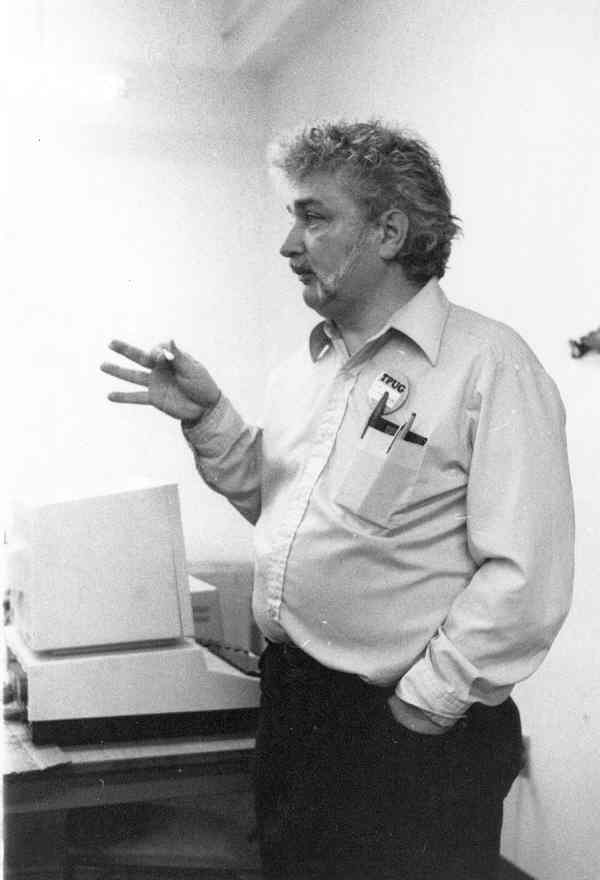
- Born: 14 February 1936; Ponoka, Alberta, Canada
- Died: 29 June 2007 (aged 71); Toronto, Ontario, Canada
- Occupations: Computer programmer, author, public speaker
- Spouse: Vicki Butterfield

Frank James Butterfield (14 February 1936 – 29 June 2007), was a Canadian computer programmer, author, and television personality known for his work with early microcomputers. He is particularly noted for associations with Commodore Business Machines and the Toronto PET Users Group, for many books and articles on machine language programming, and for educational videos and TV programs.

== Early life and career ==
Jim Butterfield was born on 14 February 1936 in Ponoka, Alberta, which is south of Edmonton. He was the third of four children to James and Nancy Butterfield, who had emigrated from England to farm. In 1953 he won a French scholarship to the Banff School of Fine Arts. He later attended the University of Alberta and the University of British Columbia but dropped out due to lack of interest. One of his first jobs was radio continuity writing in Alberta.

In 1957, Butterfield began working for Canadian National/Canadian Pacific Telecommunications, at first as a microwave technician trainer in Whitehorse. In 1959 Popular Electronics Magazine published his article simplifying then new transistors for the hobbyist. In 1962 he was transferred to Toronto, and within a year was programming CN/CP's mainframe computers. Butterfield separated from CN/CP in 1981, allegedly for telling his boss that personal computers would wipe out the wire teleprinter business, though Butterfield stated that he quit voluntarily after the company relocated too far from central Toronto to make commuting worthwhile. He became a full-time freelance writer, programmer, and speaker.

== Computing career ==
In May 1976, Butterfield became intensely interested in microcomputers, purchasing a MOS KIM-1 and eventually coauthoring a book about the machine. He soon published games and applications for many computers, and became a regular contributor, and in some cases a columnist or associate editor, for computer magazines such as COMPUTE!, COMPUTE!'s Gazette, The Transactor, and Printout. Several more books followed, including Machine Language Programming for the Commodore 64 and Other Commodore Computers, a leading reference on 6510 programming which went through several editions. Butterfield's writing was praised as being "informal and witty in spite of its technical content", and so endeared him to Commodore users that The Transactor once included a centrefold of a (clothed) Butterfield.

Butterfield helped found the Toronto PET Users Group (TPUG), and was the invited speaker at its first meeting in 1979. His reputation as a speaker and educator grew, and people would drive hundreds of kilometres to early TPUG meetings to hear him speak. Butterfield gave speeches at science conferences and computer expos around the world; in Europe he was hailed as the "Commodore Pope". Commodore contracted him to tour in support of its new VIC-20 computer and later to produce training videos for the Commodore 64. In 1983, Butterfield appeared as the resident expert in the TVOntario educational series The Academy; the show served as a companion to Bits and Bytes, for which he was already the main source of technical content and author of the accompanying resource book. That year Butterfield and co-host Jack Livesley appeared at Commodore's inaugural World of Commodore show.

During the 1980s, Butterfield continued his association with TPUG, teaching a machine language course there and at George Brown College. He continued to hold regular classes and seminars at TPUG meetings, World of Commodore shows, and other events until his death. For those who could not attend in person, Butterfield accepted telephone calls every day from 10:00 A.M. to 10:00 pm, receiving hundreds of questions every week. He also had a significant presence in the online communities of the day, holding regular Q&A sessions on services such as Q-Link and GEnie. Butterfield also wrote about non-Commodore computers, such as the Atari 8-bit version of Microsoft BASIC.

An early advocate of free and source-available software, Butterfield authored a quarter of the about 80 programs which began the TPUG software library. Much of his software appeared as type-in programs in the magazines for which he was a columnist or associate editor. Among the best-known were SuperMon and TinyMon, two machine language monitors that many assembly language programmers used to debug and test code. Butterfield's only commercially marketed program was SpellPro, a spell checker for Steve Punter's popular WordPro word processor.

== Death and legacy ==
In a November 2006 newsgroup message, Butterfield announced that he was undergoing chemotherapy. He died at the Princess Margaret Hospital in Toronto on 29 June 2007. The death was announced the following day on the comp.sys.cbm newsgroup, and later in Toronto Star and Edmonton Journal obituaries.

Numerous tributes to Butterfield were published online and in the mainstream and computing press. The Globe and Mail dedicated a "Lives Lived" column to him in August 2007, and the Winter 2007 issue of the TPUG Newsletter featured dozens of biographies, eulogies, and tributes. Memorials were held at the Naval Club of Toronto on 22 September, including a tribute video by computer historian Syd Bolton, and at the World of Commodore 2007 expo on 1 December.

== Personal life ==
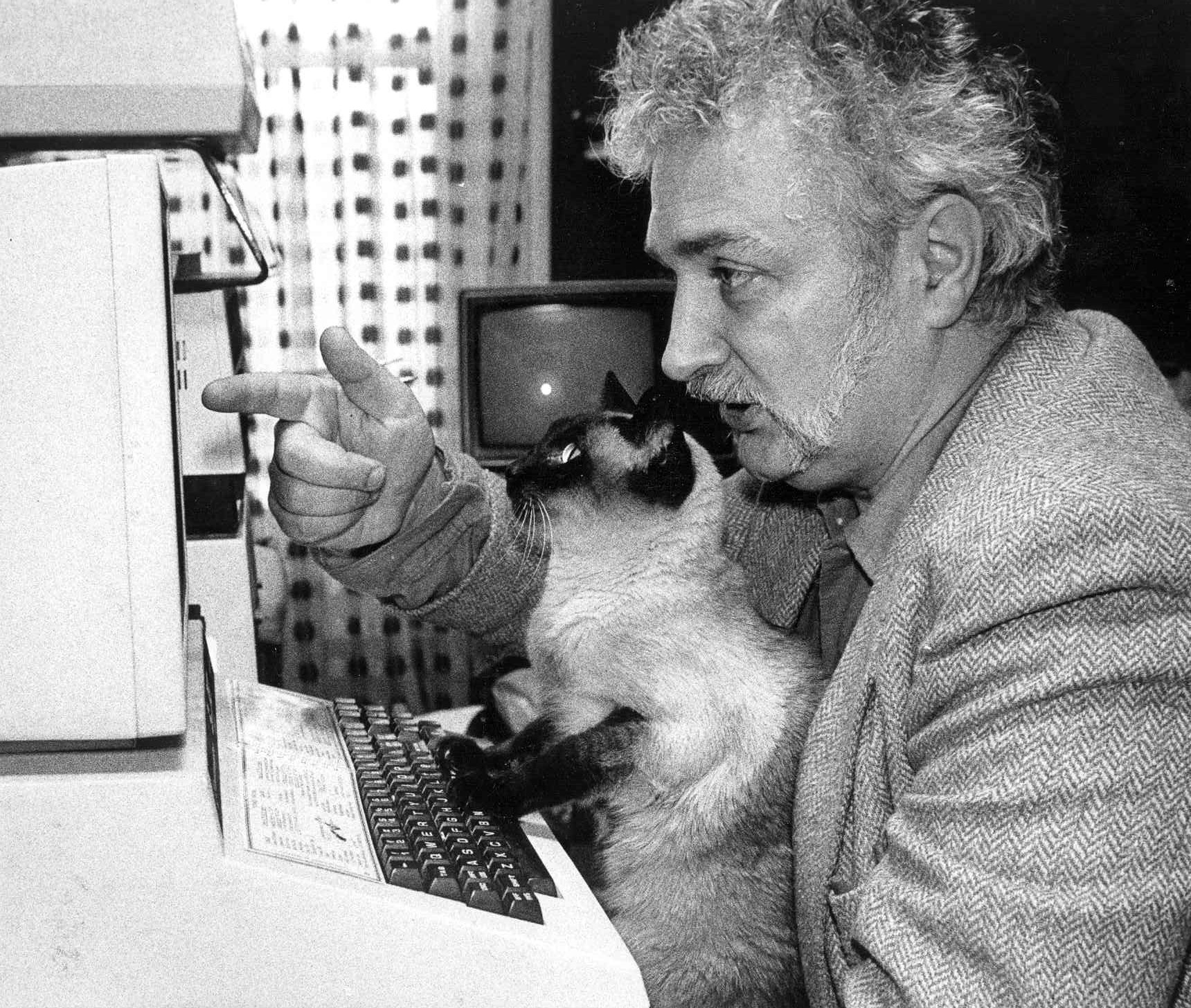
Butterfield, his pet, and his PET

Butterfield and his family lived near downtown Toronto. In his spare time he enjoyed gardening, playing the piano, caring for his many cats, socializing at the Naval Club of Toronto, and exploring downtown Toronto and the many cities he visited.

His wife, Vicki Butterfield, was not a computer enthusiast, but was an active Rhinoceros Party member who ran for office in Toronto. In 1988, the couple had a daughter, Susannah.

== Publications ==
- Butterfield, Jim; Ockers, Stan; Rehnke, Eric (1977). The First Book of KIM. Hayden Book. ISBN 0-8104-5119-0.
- — (1984). Learning Machine Code Programming on the Commodore 64 (and other Commodore computers). Brady. ISBN 9780893036546.
- — (1984). Machine Language Programming for the Commodore 64: Commodore 64/Book and 64K Disk. Simon & Schuster. ISBN 0-89303-653-6.
- — (1985). Commodore Reference Diary.
- — (1986). Machine language for the Commodore 64, 128, and other Commodore computers (Revised edition of C64 Machine Language Programming ed.). Prentice Hall. ISBN 9780893036645.
