= Richard Evers =

Canadian writer

Richard Evers (born May 31, 1959) is a Canadian publisher, programmer, technology consultant and author. Evers was editor and publisher of The Transactor and Transactor for the Amiga. He has worked for a number of Canadian technology companies, including Research in Motion, where he edited the BlackBerry Developer Journal. He is president of Northern Blue Publishing in Waterloo, Ontario, and co-author of Professional BlackBerry (Wrox) and co-author of The Trackers. He later founded Kryptera, an encryption technology for data at rest.

Evers has served as technical editor of BlackBerry for Dummies (2011; ISBN 9781118100356); BlackBerry Pearl 3G for Dummies (2011; ISBN 9780470964729); BlackBerry Java Application Development (2010; ISBN 9781849690201); BlackBerry ALL-IN-ONE for Dummies (2010; ISBN 9780470531204); BlackBerry Curve for Dummies (2010; ISBN 9780470587447); BlackBerry Storm for Dummies (2009; ISBN 9780470422205); and Mobile Guide to BlackBerry (2005).

== Bibliography ==
- The Inner Space Anthology (1985) ISBN 096920860X
- Transactor Book of Bits and Pieces (1986) ISBN 0969208618
- Professional BlackBerry (2005) ISBN 0764589539
- The Trackers (2013) ISBN 978-0-9738025-3-5
