= Billy Van =

Canadian actor (1934–2003)

- Born: William Allan Van Evera; 11 August 1934; Toronto, Ontario, Canada
- Died: 8 January 2003 (age 68); Toronto, Ontario, Canada
- Education: Bloor Collegiate Institute
- Occupations: Actor, sketch comedian, singer
- Years active: 1950s–2000
- Spouses: Joan Cooper (m. 19??; div. 19??); Patty Brooks (m. 19??; div. 19??); Annette Fike (m. 19??; div. 19??); Claudia Converse (m. 19??; div. 19??); Susan Dimitrakopoulos (m. 19??)
- Children: 2

William Allan Van Evera (11 August 1934 – 8 January 2003), known by the stage name Billy Van, was a Canadian comedian, actor, and singer.

== Biography ==
Van was born in Toronto, Ontario, and dropped out of Bloor Collegiate Institute in Grade 11 to pursue a career as an entertainer. Starting as a youth, he and his four brothers toured North America as a singing act called the Van Evera Brothers. After leaving his brothers and dropping "Evera" from his name, Van performed as a singer, leading the Billy Van Four and later the Billy Van Singers, and making frequent appearances on Canadian variety television shows such as Fancy Free. The single "I Miss You" / "The Last Sunrise" by the Billy Van Four, released on the Rodeo International label, peaked at number 29 on the CHUM Chart in Toronto in March 1961.

As a comedian, Van gained national attention in 1963 as a performer on CBC Television's late-night satire programme Nightcap. In 1966, after completion of the third season, he threatened to quit the show when the CBC wouldn't give him a requested raise from CA$400 (equivalent to $3,750 in 2025) to $500 (equivalent to $4,690 in 2025) per episode. At that time, a columnist in The Globe and Mail called Van "perhaps the most talented variety performer ever developed by the CBC." After the dispute became public, the CBC capitulated and Van continued on the show for its final season. Van appeared in a six-part spinoff series, Flemingdon Park, based on a recurring Nightcap skit, that aired at the beginning of 1967. Nightcap was cancelled in May 1967. In the United States he appeared in many commercials for Colt 45 Malt Liquor as a man sitting at a table waiting for a drink, unfazed by everything going on around him; Van starred in these commercials throughout the 1960s and 1970s, and won a Clio Award for one of these commercials in 1975.

Through the 1970s, Van was a regular member of the "home team" on the CHCH-TV charades series Party Game. In 1971, he began making The Hilarious House of Frightenstein, also for CHCH in Hamilton, Ontario. It is this show for which he is best known, and it has developed a cult following. 130 episodes were produced, and Van played almost every lead character. The characters included the Count (Count Frightenstein, for which he put on a fake Bela Lugosi-type voice); Grizelda the Ghastly Gourmet (an old witch with a cauldron who did a cooking show); the Wolfman, who, in an imitation of DJ Wolfman Jack would play records, and dance to them, while wearing a werewolf costume (rock songs from Sly and the Family Stone, The Archies, or other bands of the era were played in their entirety); the Librarian, an ancient bearded character who tried "to horrify you" with benign fairy tales from dusty old cobwebbed volumes, then would be disappointed when the unseen viewers were not horrified; Dr. Petvet, who would bring animals onto a set and talk about them (his catchphrase was "Pets are friends"); and the Oracle, who would give astrological readings, and answer fake letters from viewers while wearing a large headdress and speaking in a Peter Lorre voice.

Van was a regular performer on The Ray Stevens Show, The Ken Berry "Wow" Show, The Sonny & Cher Comedy Hour, The Bobby Vinton Show, and the Hudson Brothers Razzle Dazzle Show, most of which were co-produced by Chris Bearde, who had been a writer-performer on Nightcap. In 1982, he co-hosted TVOntario's Bits and Bytes, a show devoted to the usage of early (mostly 8-bit) personal computers, a role returned to 1991 in Bits and Bytes 2. Van narrated the animated program Eureka!, which taught children about physics and chemistry. Van also appeared occasionally in the Canadian TV show Bizarre, hosted by John Byner.

He had a triple heart bypass in 1998.

Van supported the Canadian Comedy Awards with promotional appearances from the awards' inception in 2000.

He was diagnosed in December 2001 with esophageal cancer, of which he died at age 68 on 8 January 2003 at Toronto's Sunnybrook Hospital. He was survived by his wife Susan and two daughters, Tracy and Robin, from previous marriages.

One of Van's brothers, Jack Van Evera, also became an actor and appeared on many Canadian television series such as The Forest Rangers and Adventures in Rainbow Country.

Billy Van wrote his autobiography "Second Banana," in 1997, which was published online on 11 August 2018. It is an entertaining, humorous and informative journey of his career. Second Banana is also an historical look at life in Toronto in the 1940s and 1950s and the infancy of Canadian television; a behind-the-scenes insight from a performer's perspective and reveals the often not-so-glamorous side of being an entertainer.

In December 2020, author Greg Oliver teamed with Stacey Case and Van's two daughters, Robin Edwards Mills and Tracy Van Evera, to see the publication of the biography, Who's The Man? Billy Van!

== Discography ==
=== Billy Van Four ===
- 1961: "The Last Sunrise" / "I Miss You" (Rodeo label, Canada)

=== Billy Van Singers ===
- 1967: "Spider-Man", theme song of the 1967 Canadian-American animated series
- 1968: Polydor Presents The Billy Van Singers LP (Polydor)
- 1969: "Fall In" A Fun Fashion Musical (DuPont Canada/Chelsea Records) on 1 track
- 1970: "Four Seasons", RPM MOR CanCon

== Filmography ==
=== Television series ===
- 1960: Fancy Free (with The Billy Van Four)
- 1960–1961: Country Hoedown
- 1963–1967: Nightcap
- 1970: The Ray Stevens Show
- 1970–1980: Party Game
- 1971: Rollin' on the River (with Kenny Rogers and The First Edition)
- 1971: The Hilarious House of Frightenstein
- 1972: The Ken Berry "Wow" Show
- 1972–1973: Waterville Gang (voice)
- 1973–1974: The Sonny & Cher Comedy Hour
- 1974: The Hudson Brothers Razzle Dazzle Show
- 1974: Shh! It's the News
- 1975–1976: The Bobby Vinton Show
- 1976: The Sonny and Cher Show
- 1979–80: Circus
- 1980: Eureka! (voice)
- 1980: Bizarre
- 1981: Seeing Things (guest star)
- 1983: Bits and Bytes (host)
- 1984: The Littlest Hobo (TV Series) Episode FireHorse (part 1 & 2) (Guest Star as Fire Chief Danford)
- 1987: I'll Take Manhattan
- 1988: How Do You Do? (as robot (TVOntatrio))
- 1989–1995: Join In! (TV Series) (voice)
- 1991: Bits and Bytes 2 (host)
- 1998: Stories From My Childhood (voice)

=== Television movies ===
- 1985: The Hearst and Davies Affair
- 1986: A Deadly Business
- 1988: Family Reunion
- 1992: The Trial of Red Riding Hood
- 1995: Net Worth

=== Movies ===
- 1982: The Wizard of Oz (voice)
