= CDTV =

Multimedia entertainment and video game console

Commodore CDTV

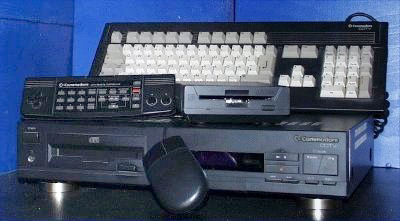
- Manufacturer: Commodore International
- Type: Home multimedia entertainment / Home video game console / Personal computer
- Generation: Fourth
- Released: March 1991; 35 years ago
- Introductory price: US$999 (equivalent to $2,360 in 2025)
- Units sold: Germany: 25,800; UK: ~29,000
- Operating system: AmigaOS 1.3
- CPU: Motorola 68000 @ 7 MHz
- Memory: 1 MB RAM
- Storage: 2 KB non-volatile RAM
- Removable storage: CD-ROM
- Display: Television, Composite or RGB monitor; 736×567 4 bpp (PAL); 736×483 4 bpp (NTSC); 368×567 6 bpp (PAL); 368×483 6 bpp (NTSC)
- Graphics: OCS, ECS
- Sound: 4 channels, 8 bits, 28 kHz sampling rate
- Predecessor: Commodore 64 Games System
- Successor: Amiga CD32

The CDTV (from Commodore Dynamic Total Vision, later treated as a backronym for Compact Disc Television) is a home multimedia entertainment and video game console – convertible into a full-fledged personal computer by the addition of optional peripherals – developed by Commodore International and launched in April 1991.

The CDTV was based on the same technology as earlier Amiga systems, but featured a single-speed CD-ROM drive and no floppy disk drive as standard.

Commodore marketed the machine as an all-in-one multimedia appliance. As such, it targeted the same market as the Philips CD-i. The expected market for multimedia appliances did not materialize, and neither machine met with any real commercial success.

== History ==
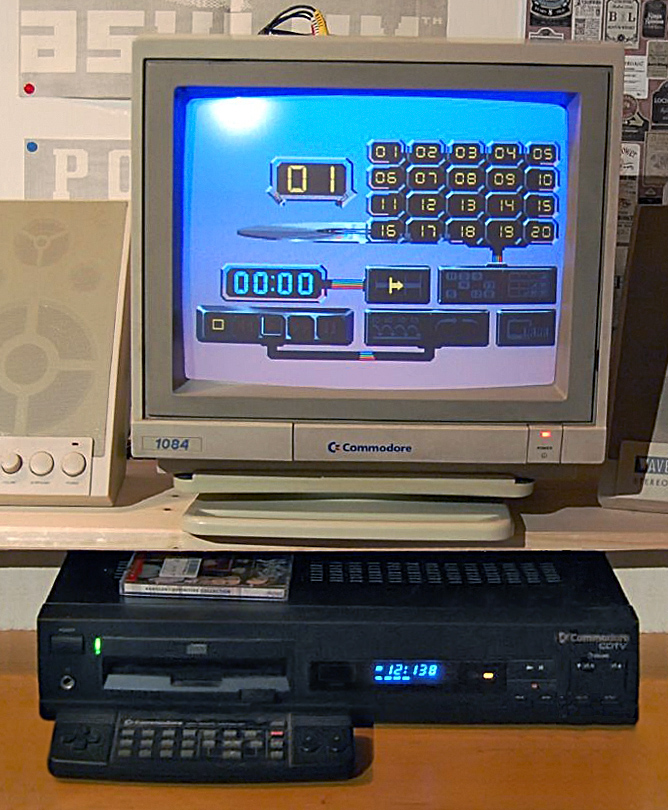
Commodore CDTV setup with 1084 monitor displaying the CDTV's audio CD player facility

Commodore announced the CDTV at the summer 1990 Consumer Electronics Show in Chicago, promising to release it before the end of the year with 100 software titles. The product debuted in North America in March 1991 (CES Las Vegas) and in the UK (World of Commodore 1991 at Earls Court, London). It was advertised at £499 for the CDTV unit, remote control and two software titles. The device was released in the United States for $999. Though the CDTV was based entirely on Amiga hardware, it was marketed strictly as a CDTV, with the Amiga name omitted from product branding.

Market competition for high-end A/V (primary market) came from the CD-i, the Pioneer LaserActive and the Tandy Video Information System, while competition in video gaming (secondary market) came from the TurboGrafx-16, SNES and Sega Mega Drive, alongside the 3DO Interactive Multiplayer.

The Commodore CDTV is reported to have sold 25,800 units in Germany, and around 29,000 units in the UK.

In 1990 Computer Gaming World stated that Commodore had a poor reputation among consumers and developers, citing "abysmal record of customer and technical support in the past". The company chose Amiga-enthusiast magazines as its chief advertising channel, but the Amiga community on the whole avoided the CDTV in the expectation of an add-on CD-ROM drive for the Amiga, which eventually came in the form of the A570. This further hurt sales of the CDTV, as an A570-equipped A500 was electronically the same as a CDTV and, consequently, could run CDTV software, so there was very little motivation for an Amiga owner to buy a CDTV. However, Nolan Bushnell, one of the chief endorsers of the CDTV, argued the system's high price alone was enough to explain its market failure: "... it's very difficult to sell significant numbers of anything at more than $500. ... I felt that I could sell a hundred thousand of something that costs $800 standing on my head. I thought that it would be a no-brainer. And I can tell you that the number of units that we sold in the U.S. at $800 you could put in your eye and not draw tears."

By 1994 Computer Gaming World described the CDTV as a "fiasco" for Commodore. Though the company later developed an improved and cost-reduced CDTV-II, it was never released. Commodore discontinued the CDTV in 1993 with the launch of the Amiga CD32, which again was substantially based on Amiga hardware (in this case the newer Amiga 1200) but explicitly targeted the games market.

== Design ==
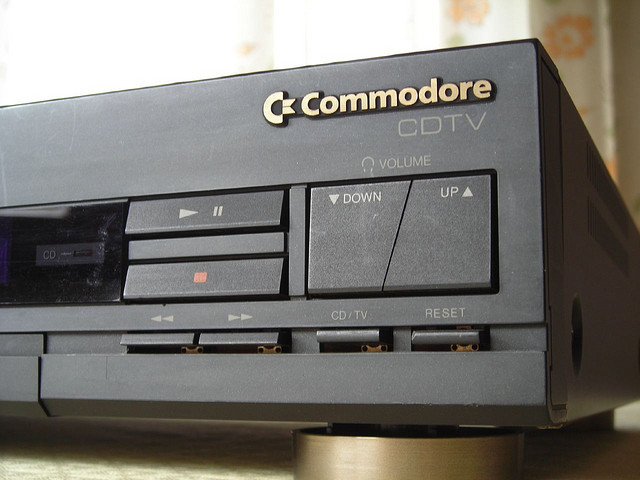
Close-up detail of the CDTV buttons

The CDTV is essentially a Commodore Amiga 500 home computer with a CD-ROM drive and remote control. With the optional keyboard, mouse, and floppy disk drive, it gained the functionality of the regular Amiga.

The CDTV was supplied with AmigaOS 1.3, rather than the more advanced and user-friendly 2.0 release that was launched at around the same time. Notably, the CDXL motion video format was primarily developed for the CDTV, making it one of the earliest consumer systems to allow video playback directly from CD-ROM.

The CDTV was intended as a media appliance rather than a mainstream personal computer. As such, it came with an infrared remote control, and its housing had dimensions and styling that was comparable to most household stereo system components of the period. For the same reason, it was initially sold without a keyboard or a mouse (which could be added separately, and were later bundled with the machine).

Two versions were released:

- CDTV: CDTV unit and remote control/gamepad
- Pro pack: CDTV unit, remote control/gamepad, keyboard, mouse and floppy disk drive, along with Almathera CDPD Public domain software compilation on CD-ROM

== Upgrades ==
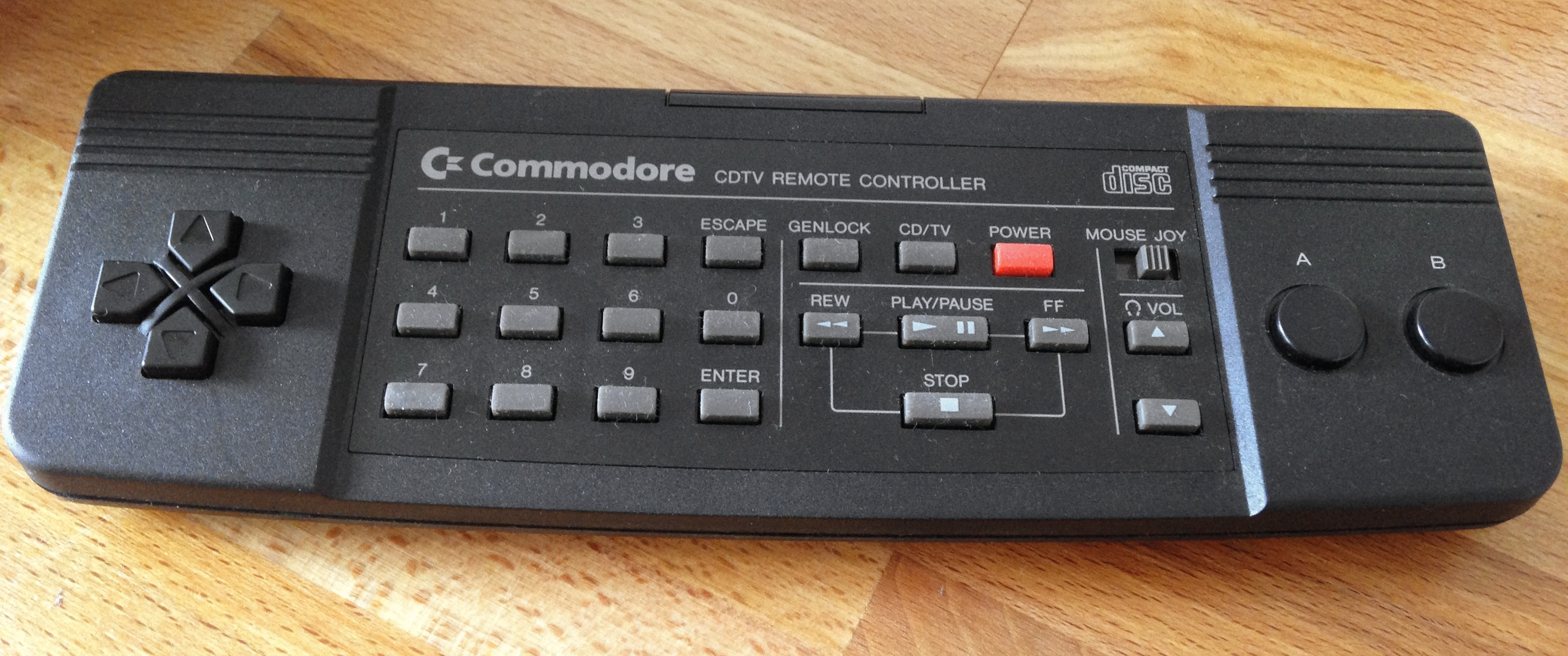
CDTV remote control

The CDTV is compatible with many Amiga peripherals from the same period. In addition, official CDTV peripherals and upgrades included:

- Wireless infrared mouse (CD1252)
- Wireless trackball
- Black styled keyboard
- SCSI controller providing both an internal and external SCSI connector for hard disk drives and other SCSI devices
- External black styled hard disk drive
- External black styled floppy disk drive (CD1411, an FB-354C)
- Proprietary memory cards with a capacity of 64 or 256 KB (CD1401/CD1405) allowing storage of game scores and progress
- Genlocks for NTSC or PAL (CD1300/CD1301) to overlay video signal with a secondary video source

In December 2021 an unofficial free ROM update was released for CDTV (2.35), which brings compatibility with 68030 accelerator boards and 32-bit Fast RAM, allows non-CDTV titles to boot, fixes bugs and restores several features that were lost in the 2.7 and 2.30 ROMs. Because of copyright reasons the custom ROM is distributed in patch form.

== Technical specifications ==
Attribute	Specification
Processor	Motorola 68000 at 7.16 MHz (NTSC)^{[a]} or 7.09 MHz (PAL)^{[b]}^{[c]}
RAM	1 MB Amiga Chip RAM (upgradable); 2 KB non-volatile RAM
ROM	256 KB Kickstart ROM; 256 KB CDTV firmware ROM
Chipset	Original Chip Set (OCS); Enhanced Chip Set (ECS)
Video	12-bit color palette (4096 colors); Graphics modes with up to 32, 64 (EHB mode), or 4096 (HAM mode) on-screen colors: 320 × 200 to 320 × 400i (NTSC)^{[a]}; 320 × 256 to 320 × 512i (PAL)^{[b]}^{[c]}; Graphics modes with up to 16 on-screen colors: 640 × 200 to 640 × 400i (NTSC)^{[a]}; 640 × 256 to 640 × 512i (PAL)^{[b]}^{[c]}
Audio	Four 8-bit PCM channels (two stereo channels); 28 kHz maximum DMA sampling rate
Removable storage	Single-speed CD-ROM drive (proprietary controller)
Input/output ports	Keyboard (5 pin mini-DIN); Mouse (4 pin mini-DIN); RS-232 serial port (DB-25M); Centronics-style parallel port (DB-25F); Floppy disk drive port (DB-23F); MIDI (in and out)
Audio/Video output	Audio out (Two RCA and 6.35 mm stereo phone jack); Analog RGB video out (DB-23M); RF audio/video out (RCA^{[a]} or RF loop through^{[b]}); Composite video out (RCA)^{[a]}^{[b]}; S-Video out (4-pin mini-DIN)^{[a]}; SCART audio/video out^{[c]}
Expansion slots	Proprietary card slot by ITT-Cannon and Fujisoku for 8 KB to 1024 KB non-volatile memory cards (1 MB addressing needs a hardware hack); 80-pin diagnostic slot; 30-pin DMA expansion slot; Video slot
Operating system	AmigaOS 1.3 (Kickstart 1.3/Workbench 1.3); CDTV firmware
Physical dimensions	430 × 330 × 95 mm (width × depth × height)
Other	Wireless infrared remote control/gamepad (40 kHz); Front panel with display and controls for CD player

Notes

1. North American model
2. UK model
3. European model

== Software ==
There are currently 63 games on this list.

Games
Title	Genre(s)	Developer(s)	Publisher(s)	Release date(s)	CDTV version
Air Warrior	Simulation	Kesmai	On-Line	1992	
Alistair in Outer Space Makes Learning Fun	Mini-games	Altered Images	Altered Images	1993	CDTV exclusive
Barney Bear Goes Camping	Mini-games	Free Spirit	Free Spirit	1990	
Barney Bear Goes To School	Mini-games	Free Spirit	Free Spirit	1991	
Battle Chess	Board game	Quicksilver	Interplay	1992	CD Audio; Released for CD32 in 1994
Battlestorm	Platform	Titus	Titus	1992	
The Case of the Cautious Condor	Adventure	Tiger Media	Tiger Media	1991	CDTV exclusive
Casino Games	Casino	Saen Software	Saen Software	1992	CDTV exclusive
Chaos In Andromeda: Eyes Of The Eagle	RPG	KirkMoreno	On-line	1992	CD Audio; FMV
Classic Board Games	Board game	Merit	Merit	1991	
Cover Girl Strip Poker	Cards game	Emotional Pictures	On-line	1991	
Curse Of RA, The	Puzzle	Cyberstyle	Rainbow Arts	1992	
Defender of the Crown	Strategy	Cinemaware	CDTV Publishing	1991	
E.S.S. Mega	Simulation	Tomahawk	Coktel	1992	CDTV exclusive
Falcon	Simulation	Rowan	Mirrorsoft	1991	
Fantastic Voyage	Shooter	Centaur	Centaur	1992	
Fun School 3 (For The 5 To 7 Year Olds)	Mini-games	Database Educational Software	Database Educational Software	1991	
Fun School 3 (For The Over 7s)	Mini-games	Database Educational Software	Database Educational Software	1991	Extra games
Fun School 3 (For The Under 5s)	Mini-games	Database Educational Software	Database Educational Software	1991	
Guy Spy and the Crystals of Armageddon	Action	ReadySoft	ReadySoft	1993	
Holiday Maker	Adventure	PM Entertainment	Software 2000	1990	
The Hound Of The Baskervilles	Adventure	On-line	On-line	1991	CDTV exclusive
Indiana Jones and the Last Crusade: The Graphic Adventure	Adventure	Lucasfilm	Softgold	1992	
Lemmings	Puzzle	DMA Design	Psygnosis	1992	
Log!cal	Puzzle	Rainbow Arts	Rainbow Arts	1991	
Loom	Adventure	Lucasfilm	Softgold	1992	
Mind Run	Puzzle	Créalude	Créalude	1991	CDTV exclusive
Murder Makes Strange Deadfellows	Adventure	Tiger Media	Tiger Media	1991	CDTV exclusive
North Polar Expedition	Adventure	Virgin Interactive	Virgin Interactive	1992	CDTV exclusive
Power Pinball	Pinball	KarmaSoft	KarmaSoft	1991	Extra levels
Prehistorik	Platform	Titus	Titus	1994	
Prey: An Alien Encounter	RPG	KirkMoreno	KirkMoreno	1993	CDTV exclusive; Later released as an enhanced version for the CD32
Psycho Killer	Adventure	Delta 4 Interactive	On-line	1992	CDTV exclusive
Raffles	Adventure	Softek	The Edge	1991	
Sherlock Holmes, Consulting Detective	Adventure	Icom	Icom	1991	CDTV exclusive
Sim City	Strategy	Maxis	Infogrames	1991	CDTV enhanced
Snoopy In The Case Of The Missing Blanket	Adventure	Softek	The Edge	1991	
Space Wars	Shooter	Odyssey	Odyssey	1992	CDTV enhanced
Spirit Of Excalibur	Adventure	Synergistic	Virgin Mastertronic	1991	
Sprachraetsel Englisch 1: Spielend Sprachen lernen!	Logic	Ingenio	Ingenio	1990	CDTV exclusive
Sprachraetsel Englisch 2: Spielend Sprachen lernen!	Logic	Ingenio	Ingenio	1990	CDTV exclusive
Sprachraetsel Englisch 3: Spielend Sprachen lernen!	Logic	Ingenio	Ingenio	1990	CDTV exclusive
Sprachraetsel Franzoesisch 1: Spielend Sprachen lernen!	Logic	Ingenio	Ingenio	1990	CDTV exclusive
Sprachraetsel Latein 1: Spielend Sprachen lernen!	Logic	Ingenio	Ingenio	1990	CDTV exclusive
Sprachraetsel Spanisch 1: Spielend Sprachen lernen!	Logic	Ingenio	Ingenio	1990	CDTV exclusive
Stadt Der Löwen, Die	Adventure	PM Entertainment	Software 2000	1991	
Strip Poker Live	Cards game	Porky's Production	Porky's Production	1993	CD Audio; FMV
Team Yankee	Simulation	Oxford Digital Enterprises	Empire	1992	
Tie Break	Sports	Starbyte	Starbyte	1991	
Top Banana	Platform	Hex	Hex	1992	
The Town With No Name	Adventure	Delta 4 Interactive	On-line	1992	CDTV exclusive
Trivial Pursuit	Quiz	Domark	Domark	1992	CDTV exclusive; Later released as an enhanced version for the CD32; CD Audio
Turrican	Shooter	Factor 5	Rainbow Arts	1992	
Turrican II: The Final Fight	Shooter	Factor 5	Rainbow Arts	1992	
Ultimate Basketball	Sports	Context Systems	Context Systems	1991	CDTV version of Omni-Play Basketball
Will Bridge: Competition	Cards game	Will-Bridge	Will-Bridge	1991	CDTV exclusive
Will Bridge: Haute Competition	Cards game	Will-Bridge	Will-Bridge	1991	CDTV exclusive
Will Bridge: Initiation Aux Encheres; Will Bridge: Introduction To Bidding	Cards game	Will-Bridge	Will-Bridge	1991	CDTV exclusive
Will Bridge: Standard	Cards game	Will-Bridge	Will-Bridge	1991	CDTV exclusive
Will Bridge: Perfectionnement; Will Bridge: Intermediate	Cards game	Will-Bridge	Will-Bridge	1991	CDTV exclusive
Winzer	Strategy	Golden Gate Crew	Starbyte	1992	
Wrath Of The Demon	Action	Abstrax	ReadySoft	1991	
Xenon 2: Megablast	Shooter	Assembly Line, The	Image Works	1992	

Bundles
Title	Developer(s)	Publisher(s)	Release date(s)	CDTV version
Cubulus & Magic Serpent	Software 2000	Software 2000	1991	ECS version of Cubulus and Magic Serpent
Lettrix & Shiftrix	Software 2000	Software 2000	1991	ECS version of Lettrix and Shiftrix
Super Games Pak	Odyssey	Odyssey	1991	ECS version of Byteman, Deathbots and Jailbreak

Applications
Title	Developer(s)	Publisher(s)	Release date(s)	CDTV version
All Dogs Go To Heaven: Electric Crayon Deluxe	Merit	Merit	1991	
A Bun For Barney	BBC Multimedia	BBC Multimedia	1992	CDTV exclusive
Cinderella: The Original Fairy Tale	Discis	Discis	1992	CDTV exclusive
Heather Hits Her First Home Run	Discis	Discis	1991	CDTV exclusive
Learn French With Astérix Disc 1	Eurotalk	Eurotalk	1991	CDTV exclusive
Learn French With Astérix Disc 2	Eurotalk	Eurotalk	1991	CDTV exclusive
A Long Hard Day On The Ranch	Discis	Discis	1991	CDTV exclusive
Moving Gives Me A Stomach Ache	Discis	Discis	1992	CDTV exclusive
Mud Puddle	Discis	Discis	1992	CDTV exclusive
Musicolor	Binary Vision	Virgin Interactive	1992	CDTV exclusive
My Paint CDTV	Saddleback	Saddleback	1991	CDTV only
The Night Before Christmas	Discis	Discis	1991	CDTV exclusive
Ordicode	Educom	Educom	1991	CDTV exclusive
The Paper Bag Princess	Discis	Discis	1992	CDTV exclusive
Read With Astérix: Astérix And Son	Eurotalk	Eurotalk	1991	CDTV exclusive
Read With Astérix: The Secret Weapon	Eurotalk	Eurotalk	1991	CDTV exclusive
Scary Poems For Rotten Kids	Discis	Discis	1991	CDTV exclusive
The Tale of Benjamin Bunny	Discis	Discis	1991	CDTV exclusive
The Tale Of Peter Rabbit	Discis	Discis	1992	CDTV exclusive
Thomas' Snowsuit	Discis	Discis	1991	CDTV exclusive

== See also ==
- Amiga A570
- Amiga CD32
- Amiga models and variants
