= Oldfield (name) =

Oldfield is a surname, and occasionally a given name.

== Given name ==
- Oldfield Thomas, British zoologist

== Surname ==
- Anne Oldfield, 18th century English actress
- Audrey Oldfield, Australian children's writer and historian
- Augustus Frederick Oldfield, 19th century botanist
- Barney Oldfield, early American automobile racer
- Bert Oldfield, Australian cricket player
- Brian Oldfield, American track and field athlete
- Bruce Oldfield, British fashion designer
- Buddy Oldfield, British cricket player and umpire
- Christopher Oldfield, English cricketer and British Army officer
- Clarence Oldfield, South African runner and Olympic medalist
- Claude Houghton Oldfield, British novelist who published as Claude Houghton
- David Oldfield (politician), Australian politician
- David Oldfield (footballer), English football player and manager
- Edmund L. Oldfield (1863–1938), American politician
- Eric Oldfield (actor), Australian actor
- George Oldfield (police officer), a British police detective involved in a number of high-profile cases
- George S. Oldfield, a prominent academic in the field of finance
- Jim Oldfield, American magazine writer on computers
- John Oldfield (footballer) (1943–2002), English footballer
- John Oldfield (engineer) (1937–2002), British engineer and Ford executive
- John William Oldfield (1886–1955), figure in the commercial and public life in Ceylon
- Maurice Oldfield, director of MI6 in the 1970s
- Mike Oldfield, British rock instrumentalist best known for his work Tubular Bells
- Ora A. Oldfield (1893–1963), American businessman and politician
- Paul Oldfield (active 1991-), flatulent performer, known as Mr. Methane
- Pearl Peden Oldfield (1876–1962), American politician
- Sally Oldfield, British singer and sister of Mike Oldfield
- Terry Oldfield, British composer and brother of Mike Oldfield
- Terry Oldfield (footballer), English footballer who played for Bristol Rovers and Wrexham
- Wendy Oldfield, South African singer
- William Oldfield (British politician) (1881–1961)
- William Allan Oldfield (1874–1928), American congressman from Arkansas
- Yvonne Oldfield, Jamaican cricketer
