= The TORPET =

Computer magazine published 1980–1984

- Issue 18 (March/April 1983)
- Editor: Bruce Beach
- Frequency: Monthly
- Publisher: Bruce Beach
- First issue: November 1980
- Final issue: August 1984
- Country: Canada
- Based in: Toronto
- ISSN: 0821-1809

The TORPET was a Toronto-based computer magazine directed at users of Commodore's 8-bit home computers.

== Publication history ==
Though named for and associated with the Toronto PET Users Group (TPUG), the magazine was published independently of the club as a commercial enterprise with paid writers. Twenty-eight issues were produced for TPUG from November 1980 to August 1984.

In 1984 TORPET's owner and editor, Bruce Beach, dissociated the publication from TPUG and relaunched it as an oceanography journal, backronymming its name to Today's Oceanographic Research Program for Education & Training. TPUG launched its own computing journal, TPUG Magazine, in February 1984.

A 320-page anthology of The TORPET's most popular articles, The Best of The TORPET Plus More for the Commodore 64 and the VIC-20, was published in 1984 by Copp Clark Pitman. It featured type-in listings for over a thousand freeware programs, articles and cartoon strips teaching BASIC and machine language programming, memory maps, and user documentation for popular public domain software.
