= Steve Punter =

Programmer and media personality

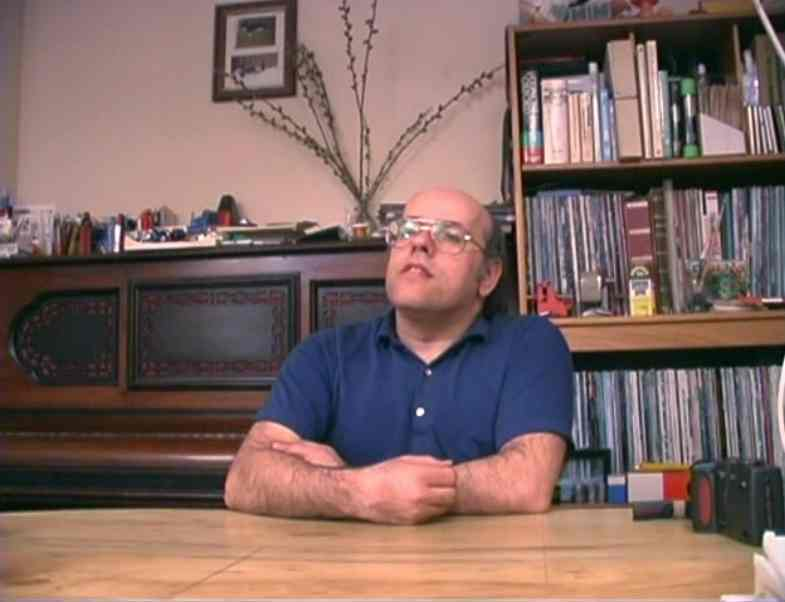
Steve Punter in BBS: The Documentary

Steve Punter (born 1958 in Toronto, Ontario) is a Toronto-based programmer and media personality.

Punter is noted for his work with Commodore microcomputers. He created WordPro, the first major word processor for the Commodore PET and Commodore 64 computers. He is also the designer of the Punter binary file transfer protocols which bear his name. He wrote the PunterNet networked BBS program in the late 1980s.

In the 1980s Punter designed and operated the bulletin board system (BBS) for the Toronto PET Users Group. He was an occasional speaker at the World of Commodore expos, and is featured in the film BBS: The Documentary.

He is an expert on cell phones and cell phone network coverage, in which capacity he has made occasional network TV appearances since the early 2000s.

== See also ==
- Punter protocol
