= Omni-Play Basketball =

1989 video game

- Developer: DesignStar Consultants
- Publisher: SportTime
- Platforms: Amiga, Commodore 64, DOS
- Release: 1989

Omni-Play Basketball is a 1989 video game published by SportTime.

== Gameplay ==
Omni-Play Basketball is a game in which the player can be the coach, general manager, and star player in different game modes as part of a five-on-five full court basketball game.

== Reception ==
Michael S. Chaut and Matt Rosenburg reviewed the game for Computer Gaming World, and stated that "The gameplay as well as the real-life aspects of the game seem to be covered completely. Overall, this game is a must for the sports simulation and statistical buff as well as the multi-player game fan. The game also takes into account whether the player is a "joystick jockey" or not and allows a set-up where strategy is the main concern. Considering the expandability factor and the flexibility in game play, SportTime's Omni-Play Basketball is tops!"

Mike Siggins reviewed Omni-Play Basketball for Games International magazine, and gave it 3 stars out of 5, and stated that "It represents a worthwhile purchase for those with a liking for the sport and some skill with arcade-type systems. Don't expect too many thrills though."
