= Oldborough =

Hamlet in Devon, England

Coordinates: 50.84°N 03.74°W

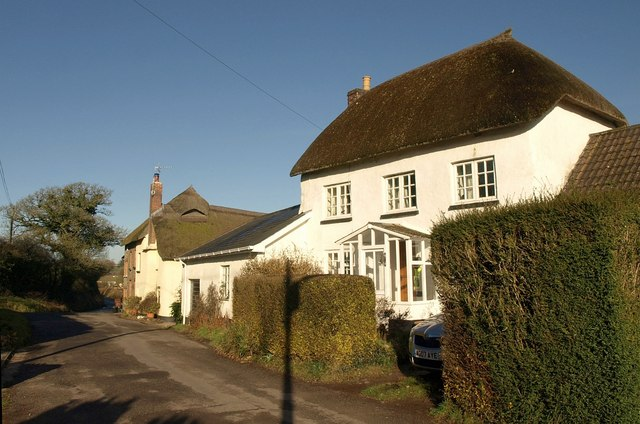
- Cottages at Oldborough

- Location within Devon
- OS grid reference: SS7706
- Shire county: Devon
- Region: South West
- Country: England
- Sovereign state: United Kingdom
- Police: Devon and Cornwall
- Fire: Devon and Somerset
- Ambulance: South Western

Oldborough is a hamlet in Devon, England. It is near the village of Morchard Bishop. Oldborough has a population of just under 1,000 people. The only remaining pub is the London Inn. The village has a school and post office.
