= Offleyhay =

Coordinates: 52.86°N 02.30°W

- Location within Staffordshire
- OS grid reference: SJ7929
- Civil parish: Eccleshall
- Shire county: Staffordshire
- Region: West Midlands
- Country: England
- Sovereign state: United Kingdom
- Post town: Stafford
- Postcode district: ST21
- Police: Staffordshire
- Fire: Staffordshire
- Ambulance: West Midlands

Offleyhay is a village in Staffordshire, England. The population as taken at the 2011 census can be found under Eccleshall.
