= Old Balornock =

Coordinates: 55.87°N 04.22°W

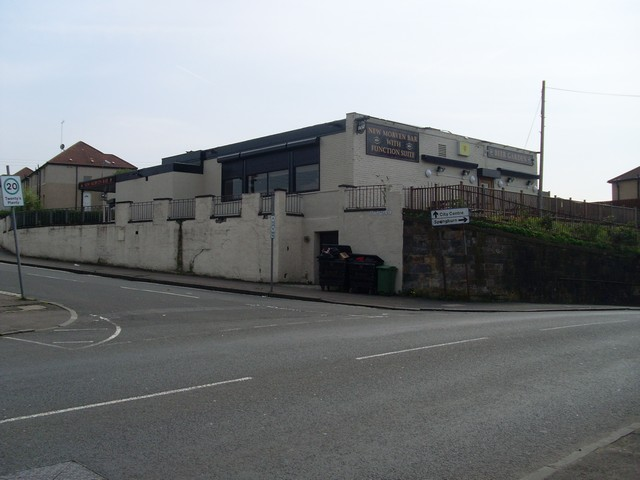
- New Morven Bar Pub in Old Balornock, 2009

- Location within the Glasgow City council area Location within Scotland
- OS grid reference: NS6167
- Council area: Glasgow City
- Country: Scotland
- Sovereign state: United Kingdom
- Police: Scotland
- Fire: Scottish
- Ambulance: Scottish

Old Balornock is a suburb in the Glasgow City council area, Scotland. It is estimated a community started to form in the area in the 12th century, and later the land became property of the Glasgow Cathedral, a prominent and powerful church in Scotland. It later became primarily farmland until the late 1800s and early 1900s. The industrial revolution marked a turning point in the city's economy and infrastructure by urbanizing the village with new residential and commercial buildings. Perhaps the biggest change the industrial revolution brought to Old Balornock was its integration into Glasgow City Area, as stated in the 1891 Glasgow Corporation act.
