= Oldbury Naite =

Village in United Kingdom

- Village
- Coordinates: 51.643°N 2.555°W

Oldbury Naite is a village in South Gloucestershire, England.
