= Okle Green =

Coordinates: 51.92°N 02.36°W

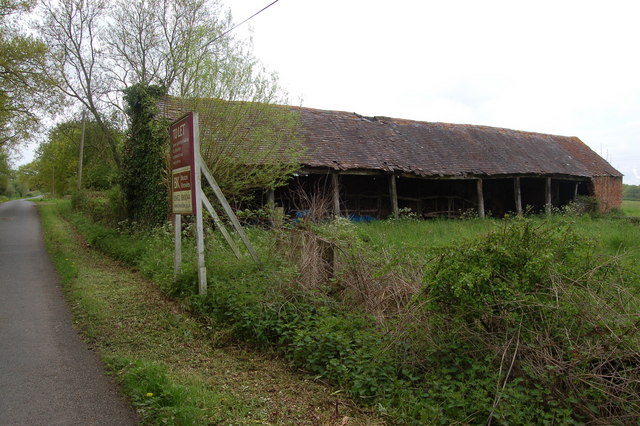
- Former agricultural building awaiting re-development near Okle Green

- Location within Gloucestershire
- OS grid reference: SO7525
- Shire county: Gloucestershire
- Region: South West
- Country: England
- Sovereign state: United Kingdom
- Police: Gloucestershire
- Fire: Gloucestershire
- Ambulance: South Western

Okle Green is a hamlet in Gloucestershire, England.
