= Jim Oldfield =

Jim Oldfield (March 4, 1952 – July 30, 2023) was an author, editor, and reviewer famous for his work with Commodore computers. He was married to Deb Oldfield and was the father of James, Jon, and Jason Oldfield.

He was the founder of the pioneering Commodore magazine, the Midnite Software Gazette, and was Associate Editor of .info (magazine). He was vice president and Publisher at Abacus, a computer book and software publisher that specializes in supporting simulation software.
