= Old Church Stoke =

Coordinates: 52.53°N 03.06°W

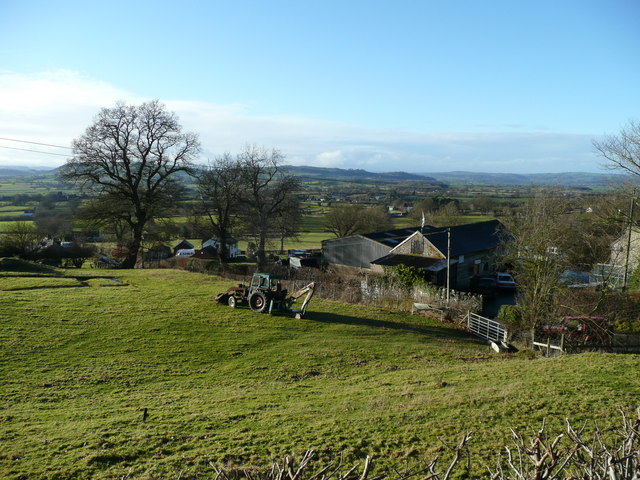
- View of the hamlet of Old Church Stoke

- Location within Powys
- OS grid reference: SO2894
- Community: Churchstoke
- Principal area: Powys
- Country: Wales
- Sovereign state: United Kingdom
- Police: Dyfed-Powys
- Fire: Mid and West Wales
- Ambulance: Welsh

Old Church Stoke is a village in the community of Churchstoke in Powys, Wales. Until 1974 it was in the county of Montgomeryshire.

The name, as a distinct settlement within the township and parish of Churchstoke, was first recorded in the mid-16th century. The current village includes several timber-framed farmhouses of the 17th and 18th century, the former Oak Inn from the same period, and a 19th-century Methodist chapel.

There was formerly a holy well, or "Lady well", in the village, which was dressed with flowers and rushes.

There are several farms located in Old Churchstoke, one being Upper Aldress, farmed by Robert Kinsey and his family.
