= Old Balkello =

Coordinates: 56°31′55″N 3°01′55″W

- Location within Angus
- OS grid reference: NO367382
- Council area: Angus
- Lieutenancy area: Angus
- Country: Scotland
- Sovereign state: United Kingdom
- Police: Scotland
- Fire: Scottish
- Ambulance: Scottish
- UK Parliament: Dundee West
- Scottish Parliament: Angus South

Old Balkello is a village in Angus, Scotland, three miles north of Dundee on the Auchterhouse to Tealing road.

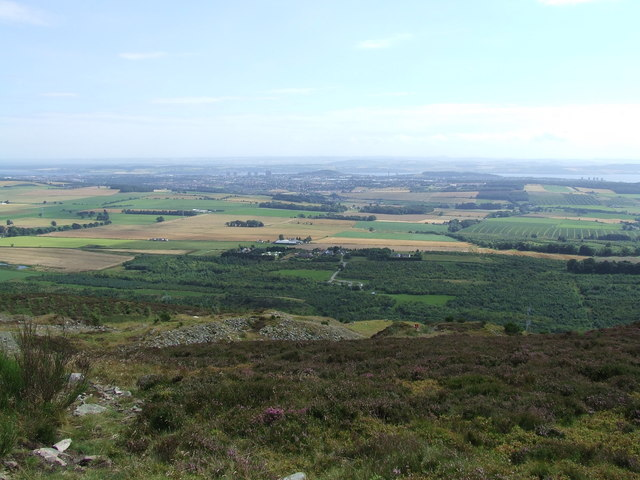
Looking south from Balluderon Hill, over Balkellos, old and new, towards Dundee
