= Amiga A570 =

External CD-ROM drive

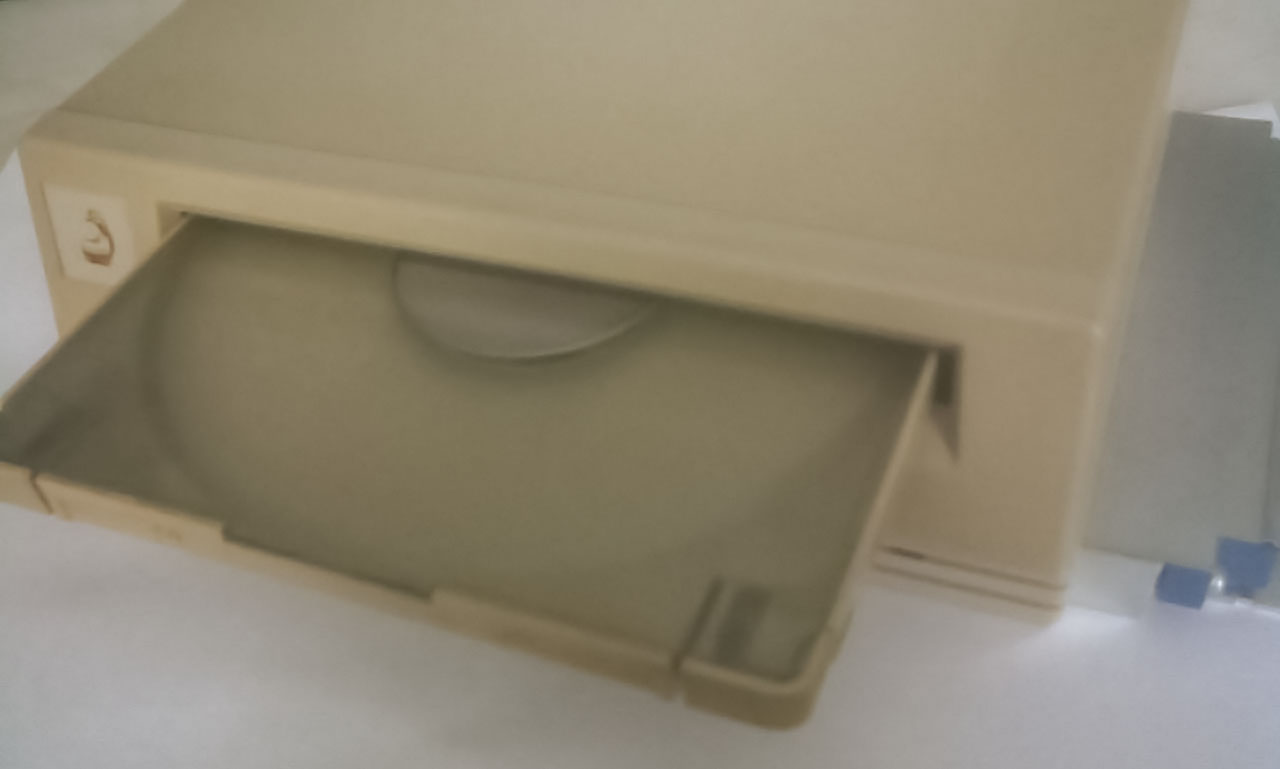
A570 drive with ejected caddy

The Amiga A570 is a single-speed external CD-ROM drive for the Amiga 500 computer launched by Commodore in 1992. It was designed to be compatible with Commodore CDTV software as well as being able to read ordinary ISO 9660 CD-ROM discs.

The original designation was A690, and pre-production devices under this name were delivered to developers. The A690/A570 used a proprietary Mitsumi CD-ROM interface. It contained a header for an internal 2 Megabyte fast memory expansion, but this proprietary memory module was never put into production and only a few rare developer examples of this exist today.

It is also notable that by the time of the A570's launch, the A500 computer had already been discontinued. The Amiga 600 (ostensibly the A500's direct replacement) was, like the later A1200, incompatible with this external drive. Thus, Commodore were in the position of having launched a CD-ROM drive for a discontinued machine, while a similar device was unavailable for their current low-end Amiga. This move by Commodore marketing department could be justified by the fact that millions of A500 systems existed already, along with considerable demand for Commodore to release a more advanced data storage solution.

The device (like the Amiga A590 hard disk drive that was sold by Commodore for the A500) had no through connector, so it was not possible to connect both an A590 and an A570 to the computer at the same time. The A590, despite having an XT IDE hard disk, also carried a SCSI interface that allowed third-party hard disks and CD-ROM drives to be fitted. While these drives did not carry CDTV emulation, the lack of success of the CDTV format made this a null disadvantage for most users.

== Features ==
- Single speed CD-ROM reader
- Headphone jack on the front panel
- Audio control knob on the front panel to adjust the volume of the headphones if connected, it did not change the volume out of the rear ports as they are designed to go to an amplified speaker setup which will have their own controls
- Stereo audio in and stereo audio out connectors. The audio in connects from the A500 to the A570 and the audio out goes to the speakers (or monitor).
- 2 Megabyte RAM internal interface connector
- Rear connector bay port to add a SCSI interface card

CDs could not be inserted directly into the A570 and needed to be put in a caddy before being inserted into the reader slot.

The A570 had no need for drivers. It was automatically recognized as a standard Amiga expansion card by the Amiga Zorro bus Autoconfig feature. Programs for playing Audio CDs were available on a bundled 'A570 Tools' floppy disk, public domain software disk collections, and then on Aminet.

The A570 also featured an external power supply, which was the same model as the A500 power supply.
