= Bits and Bytes =

Canadian educational TV series about computers

- Written by: Denise Boiteau; David Stansfield
- Directed by: Stuart Beecroft
- Starring: Luba Goy; Billy Van
- Voices of: Fred Napoli
- Theme music composer: Harry Forbes; George Axon
- Country of origin: Canada
- Original language: English
- No. of series: 2
- No. of episodes: 18

Production
- Executive producer: Mike McManus
- Producers: Denise Boiteau; David Stansfield
- Editor: Michael Kushner
- Running time: 28 minutes (approx.)
- Production company: TVOntario

Original release
- Network: TVOntario
- Release: October 15, 1983 – 1991

Related
- The Computer Academy

Bits and Bytes is the name of two Canadian educational television series produced by TVOntario that taught the basics of how to use a personal computer.

The first series, made in 1983, starred Luba Goy as the Instructor and Billy Van as the Student. Bits and Bytes 2 was produced in 1991 and starred Billy Van as the Instructor and Victoria Stokle as the Student. The Writer-Producers of both Bits and Bytes and Bits and Bytes 2 were Denise Boiteau & David Stansfield.

== Title sequence ==
The intro sequence featured a montage of common computer terms such as "ERROR", "LOGO" and "ROM", as well as various snippets of simple computer graphics and video effects, accompanied by a theme song that very heavily borrows from the 1978 song "Neon Lights" by Kraftwerk.

== Series format ==
The first series featured an unusual presentation format whereby Luba Goy as the instructor would address Billy Van through a remote video link. The video link would appear to Luba who was seated in an office on a projection screen in front of her. She was then able to direct Billy, who appeared on a soundstage with various desktop computer setups of the era. Popular systems emphasized included the Atari 800, PET, TRS-80, and Apple II. Each episode also included short animated vignettes to explain key concepts, as well as videotaped segments on various developments in computing.

In 1983 TVOntario included the show's episodes as part of a correspondence course. The original broadcasts on TVOntario also had a companion series, The Academy, that was scheduled immediately afterward in which Bits and Bytes technology consultant, Jim Butterfield, appeared as co-host to further elaborate on the concepts introduced in the main series.

== Bits and Bytes 2 ==
In the second Bits and Bytes series, produced almost a decade later, Billy Van assumed the role of instructor and taught a new female student. The new series focused primarily on IBM PC compatibles (i.e. Intel-based 286 or 386 computers) running DOS and early versions of Windows, as well as the newer and updated technologies of that era. For that series, a selection of the original's animated spots are reaired to illustrate fundamental computer technology principles along with a number of new spots to cover newly emerged concepts of computer technology such as advances in computer graphics and data management.

Although the possibility of a Bits and Bytes 3 was suggested at the end of the second series, TVOntario eventually elected instead to co-produce and rebroadcast the British Columbia Knowledge Network computer series, Dotto's Data Cafe, as a more economical and extensive production on the same subject.

== Episodes (1983-84) ==
- Program 1: Getting Started
- Program 2: Ready-Made Programs
- Program 3: How Programs Work?
- Program 4: File & Data Management
- Program 5: Communication Between Computers
- Program 6: Computer Languages
- Program 7: Computer-Assisted Instruction
- Program 8: Games & Simulations
- Program 9: Computer Graphics
- Program 10: Computer Music
- Program 11: Computers at Work
- Program 12: What Next?

== Episodes (1991) ==
- Program 1: Basics
- Program 2: Words
- Program 3: Numbers
- Program 4: Files
- Program 5: Messages
- Program 6: Pictures

== Crew ==
- Original Music - Harry Forbes, George Axon
- Animation Voice - Fred Napoli
- Animation - Grafilm Productions Inc.
- Consultants - Jim Butterfield, David Humphreys, Mike H. Stein, Jo Ann Wilton
- Unit Manager - Rodger Lawson
- Production Editors - Michael Kushner, Paul Spencer, Brian Elston, Doug Beavan
- Production Assistant - George Pyron
- Executive Producer - Mike McManus
- Director - Stu Beecroft
- Written & Produced by - Denise Boiteau and David Stansfield
