= The Transactor =

- Vol. 5, № 4 (January 1985)
- Editor: Karl Hildon (April 1978–March 1987)
- Publisher: Commodore Canada (April 1978–August 1982); Canadian Micro Distributors (September 1982–April 1983); Transactor Publishing (July 1983–September 1988); Croftward Publishing (December 1988–August 1989)
- Paid circulation: 72,000
- First issue: April 1978
- Final issue: August 1989
- Country: Canada
- Based in: Milton, Ontario
- ISSN: 0827-2530

The Transactor was a computer magazine directed at users of Commodore home computers.

In contrast to other Commodore-focused publications such as Commodore Magazine and COMPUTE!'s Gazette, The Transactor's popularity was based on its coverage of deep technical issues and hardware hacking. INFO called The Transactor "the undeniable authority" on "Commodore programming and hardware information".

== Publication history ==
The magazine was launched on 30 April 1978 as the official international bulletin of Commodore Canada to PET user groups. The early issues were low-tech mimeographed productions with no non-Commodore advertising and a roughly monthly release schedule. Despite its association with Commodore, the magazine earned a reputation for being honest and upfront about bugs and faults in Commodore's products.

In September 1982 the magazine was relaunched as a fully independent, bimonthly, advertiser-supported publication. From this point the magazine became professionally typeset with full-colour illustrated covers. It was sold by subscription throughout its run, and also appeared on newsstands from June 1982 until July 1987; during this period the magazine claimed a peak circulation of 72,000, of which 53,000 was newsstand sales. The independent Transactor went through a succession of publishers (Canadian Micro Distributors until April 1983, then Transactor Publishing from July 1983 to September 1988, and finally British publishing house Croftward Publishing). Though a popular magazine among Commodore users, it unexpectedly went out of business and ceased publication in August 1989.

Karl Hildon served as editor-in-chief of the magazine until the March 1988 issue. Frequent contributors included Jim Butterfield and Richard Evers.

== Spin-offs ==
In January 1988, The Transactor announced that it had spun off its coverage of the Amiga to a dedicated magazine, Transactor for the Amiga.

At least four anthologies of Transactor articles appeared in book form: The Best of The Transactor Volume 1 through The Best of The Transactor Volume 3, plus The Transactor Book of Bits and Pieces #1. In the course of preparing Volume 2 Hildon was inspired to create a comprehensive reference work for Commodore 8-bit computers, which was eventually published as The Complete Commodore Inner Space Anthology.
