= Maciej Stachowiak =

Polish American software developer (born 1976)

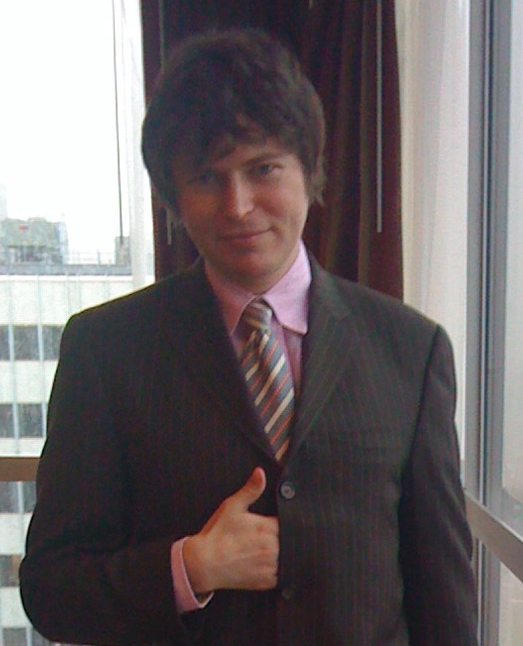
- Stachowiak in 2009
- Born: June 6, 1976 (age 50); Koszalin, Poland
- Citizenship: American
- Education: MIT Course 6 - Electrical Engineering and Computer Science S.B. and M.Eng. Electrical Engineering and Computer Science
- Parent(s): Grzegorz and Anna Stachowiak
- Engineering career
- Discipline: HTML Standards
- Employer: Apple Inc.
- Projects: Nautilus, GNOME, Safari / WebKit
- Significant design: HTML 5, WebKit

Maciej Stachowiak (/ˈmætʃeɪ stəˈhoʊvi.æk/; born June 6, 1976) is a Polish American software developer currently employed by Apple Inc., where he is a leader of the development team responsible for the WebKit Framework. A longtime proponent of open source software, Stachowiak was involved with the SCWM, GNOME and Nautilus projects for Linux before joining Apple. He is actively involved the development of web standards, served as a co-chair of the World Wide Web Consortium's HTML 5 working group and was a member of the Web Hypertext Application Technology Working Group steering committee.

== Education ==
After graduating from East High School (Rochester, New York) in 1994, Stachowiak was accepted into MIT where he completed Course 6 - Electrical Engineering and Computer Science and received both his S.B. and M.Eng. in 1998.

While at MIT Stachowiak worked on the Rethinking CS101 project, and in 1997 he began the Scheme Constraints Window Manager project with Greg J. Badros. He also contributed to a paper with the Cognitive & Neural Sciences Office of Naval Research. Stachowiak's MIT M.Eng. thesis on "Automated Extraction of Structured data from HTML Documents" was indicative of his early interest in web standards and development.

== Career ==
=== Eazel ===
From 1999 to 2001, Stachowiak contributed to various Linux software projects and was employed by Eazel as one of their lead developers along with Andy Hertzfeld and Darin Adler to create the Nautilus file manager. He was also a developer on the Object Activation Framework (OAF) for the GNOME desktop environment from 1999 to 2001. In 1999, he became a maintainer for the Scheme interpreter for Guile. During his employment at Eazel, Stachowiak also contributed to Eye of GNOME, GNOME Libs, Gravevine, GnoP, and was a Developer on Medusa, Bonobo, and GNOME VFS. Stachowiak was also a member of GNOME Foundation board of directors. He told Fortune magazine, "[Eazel's] seemed like a borderline-crazy business plan ... But I said, 'Sure, I'll work on it.'" while his colleagues "fidgeted uncomfortably". Two months later, Eazel ceased operations, laying off its entire staff.

=== Apple Inc. ===
After the closure of Eazel, most of the remaining senior engineers (including Bud Tribble, Don Melton, Darin Adler, John Sullivan, Ken Kocienda, and Stachowiak) joined Apple's Safari team in June 2001 and were later joined by Netscape/Mozilla Firefox alumnus David Hyatt. On June 13, 2002, Stachowiak announced on a mailing list that Apple was releasing JavaScriptCore, a framework for Mac OS X that was based on KDE's JavaScript engine. Through the WebKit project, JavaScriptCore has since evolved into SquirrelFish Extreme, a JavaScript engine that compiles JavaScript into native machine code. On June 6, 2005, WebKit was made open source (which was coincidentally Stachowiak's birthday).

=== Web standards participation ===
Stachowiak wrote on behalf of Apple along with members of the Mozilla Foundation and Opera Software in a proposal that the new HTML working group of the W3C adopt the Web Hypertext Application Technology Working Group’s HTML5 as the starting point of its work. On 9 May 2007, the new HTML working group resolved to do that. In May 2009, Stachowiak co-authored the W3C HTML Design Principles for HTML5, one of his first major documentation projects for the W3C. As of 27 August 2009, Stachowiak has co-chaired the World Wide Web Consortium's HTML Working Group along with IBM's Sam Ruby and Microsoft's Paul Cotton.

WebKit, the underpinnings of Safari, was published as open-source software on June 6, 2005. When Safari was run with this latest version of WebKit, it passed the Web Standards Project's Acid2 test. Stachowiak reported on the WebKit blog on March 26, 2008, that the software had passed 100/100 on the Acid3 test, making Safari the first browser to pass.
