= Chinese Dream =

Concept popularized by Xi Jinping

The Chinese Dream, (Note: Chinese: 中国梦; pinyin: Zhōngguó Mèng) also called the China Dream, is a term closely associated with Xi Jinping, the general secretary of the Chinese Communist Party (CCP). Xi began promoting the phrase as a slogan during a high-profile tour of an exhibit at the National Museum of China in November 2012, shortly after he became leader of the CCP. The exhibit at that time was called the "Road to National Rejuvenation". Xi said that the Chinese Dream is the "great rejuvenation of the Chinese nation".

Since then, the use of the phrase has become widespread in official announcements and it has also been characterized as the embodiment of the leadership's political ideology under Xi Jinping. Their strategic implementation closely ties to two significant milestones: the centenary of the CCP's founding in 2021 and the centenary of the People's Republic of China in 2049. During the "First Century", Xi's short-term goal was to achieve a moderately prosperous society by the centenary of the CCP's founding in 2021. This involves doubling the GDP per capita income from its 2010 level by 2020, which is part of the broader prospect for improving living standards and eradicating poverty, a key component of the Chinese Dream.

As for the "Second Century", its long-term goal extends to the centenary of the People's Republic of China in 2049. The objective is for China to become a "modern socialist country that is prosperous, strong, democratic, civilized, and harmonious", including other political, economic, social, and cultural dimensions. Xi said that young people should "dare to dream, work assiduously to fulfill the dreams and contribute to the revitalization of the nation." There are various connotations and interpretations of the term. The concept of the Chinese Dream is part of the inspiration for the Belt and Road Initiative and Made in China 2025.

== History ==
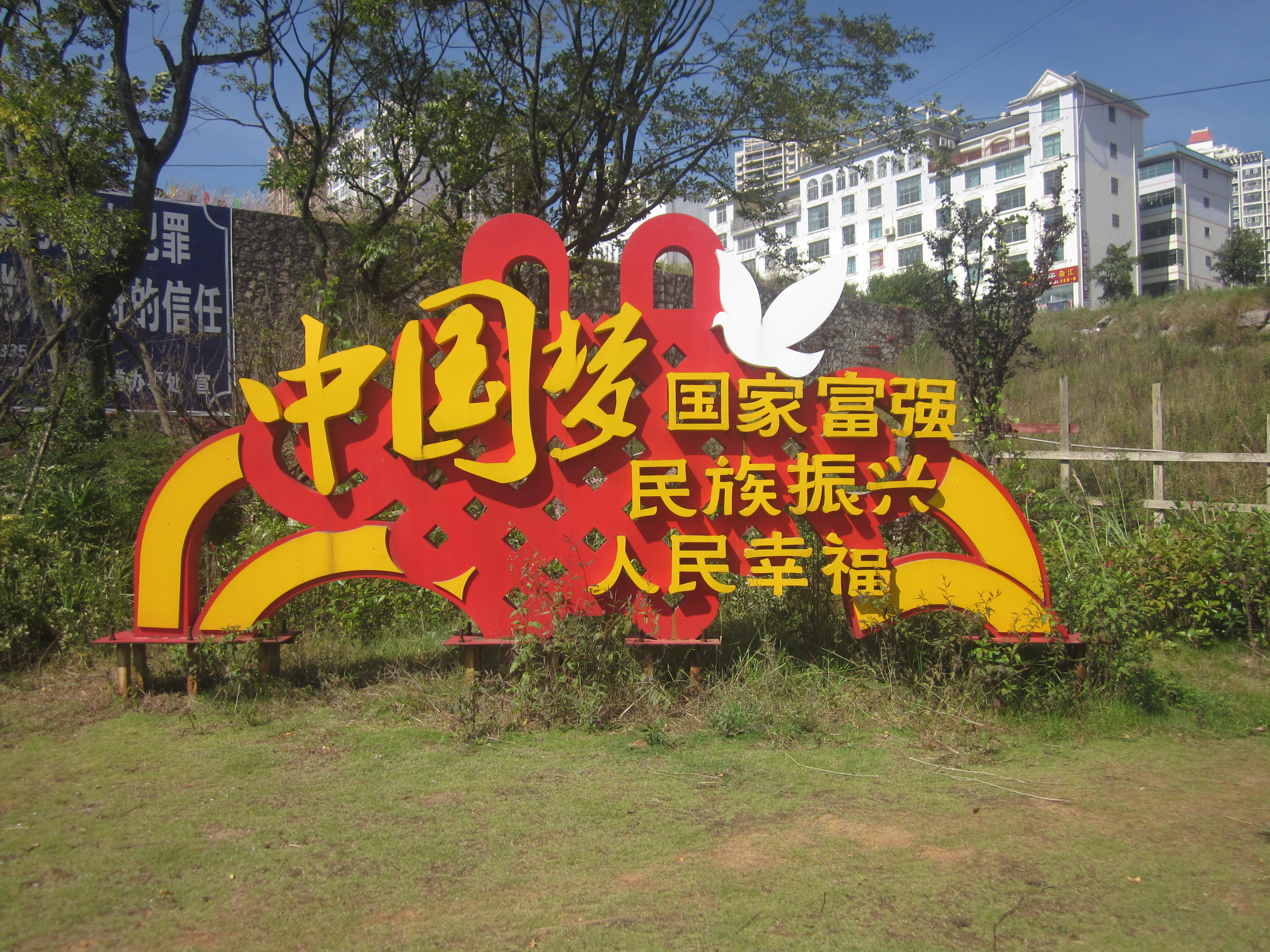
A "Chinese Dream" slogan reading "powerful country, national rejuvenation, and happiness of the people" in the South Lake Park, Panzhou, Guizhou, November 2019

=== Chinese literature ===
The phrase "Chinese Dream" (中国梦) corresponds with the associated idea of a hope for restoring earlier dynasties' lost national greatness and has ancient origins in Chinese literary and intellectual history. In the Classic of Poetry (Shi Jing), the poem "Flowing Spring" (下泉) describes a poet waking up in despair after dreaming of the former Western Zhou dynasty. During the troubled Southern Song dynasty, the poet Zheng Sixiao wrote a poem in which he coined the phrase "Heart full of [the] Chinese Dream (中国梦), the ancient poem 'Flowing Spring'" (一心中国梦，万古下泉诗), referring back to the classical poem. Popular patriotic literary and theatrical works in early 20th century China also made reference to a "China Dream".

=== Western writing ===
Dutch architect Neville Mars used the phrase in his 2006 architecture text, Chinese Dream: A Society under Construction.

In 2010, author Helen H. Wang published her book The Chinese Dream: The Rise of the World's Largest Middle Class and What it Means to You, which was translated into Chinese (中国梦) and published in China in 2011. In 2012, the second edition of The Chinese Dream with a foreword by Lord Wei was published. He wrote:

The Chinese Dream today as portrayed in Helen's book speaks of a changing China that is discovering consumerism, that is increasingly globalised, and also at a crossroads. Will her path in years to come continue to be one that resembles that of Western countries with all the benefits of further urbanization, wealth, and industrialization, but at the same time challenges in managing scarce resources, population migration, and the social problems that affluence can bring, elsewhere called 'Affluenza'? Or will the Chinese people themselves inside and outside China create a new sustainable Chinese Dream, based on their ancient values of respect for culture, family, and nature, harnessing technology and creativity?

==== The New York Times ====
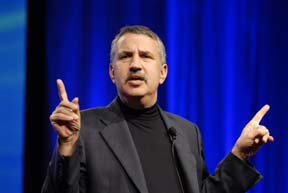
Thomas Friedman's New York Times article has been credited with popularizing the phrase "Chinese Dream" in China, after interviewing Neville Mars in Beijing in 2006, on the impact of urbanization as explored in his book "The Chinese Dream – a society under construction."

The British publication The Economist credits a column written by the American journalist Thomas Friedman for popularizing the term in China. A translation of Friedman's article, "China Needs Its Own Dream," published in The New York Times (October 2012) was widely popular in China. Friedman attributes the phrase to Peggy Liu, the founder of the environmentalist NGO JUCCCE. According to Isaac Stone Fish, former Asia editor for the magazine Foreign Policy, Friedman said, "I only deserve part credit... ensuing the concept of 'China Dream' was promoted by my friend Peggy Liu, as the motto for her NGO about how to introduce Chinese to the concept of sustainability."

James Fallows of The Atlantic has pointed out that the phrase has frequently been used in the past by journalists. He mentions Deborah Fallows' book Dreaming in Chinese, his own article "What Is the Chinese Dream?," and Gerald Lemos' book The End of the Chinese Dream as examples. In response to Fallows, The Economist cites an article in the Xinhua Daily Telegraph that directly credits Friedman.

"Will the next Chinese leader have a dream that is different from the American dream?" [a paraphrase of a line in Mr Friedman's column]. In a year of political transition, the world's gaze is focused on the east. On the eve of the 18th [Communist Party] congress [at which Mr Xi had been appointed as party chief two weeks earlier] the American columnist Thomas Friedman wrote an article devoted to analysis of the "Chinese dream" titled "China Needs Its Own Dream". It expressed the hope that [the dream would be one that] "marries people's expectations of prosperity with a more sustainable China". Suddenly the "Chinese dream" became a hot topic among commentators at home and abroad.

— Xinhua Daily Telegraph

The Economist writes that references to Friedman's article have also appeared in other Chinese media outlets, including a translation in Reference News, in an article written for China's State Council Information Office, on the cover of the magazine Oriental Outlook as the main caption, in a magazine article published by Frontline, and in an article for a local newspaper written by China's ambassador to Romania, Huo Yuzhen.

In the preface of the Oriental Outlook "Chinese Dream" issue, the editor states that "the 18th national congress of the Chinese Communist Party convened November 8th. "Does the next generation of Chinese leaders have a 'Chinese Dream' that is different from the "American Dream"?.... This was a question raised by one of America's most influential media figures, Thomas Friedman."

=== Xi Jinping ===
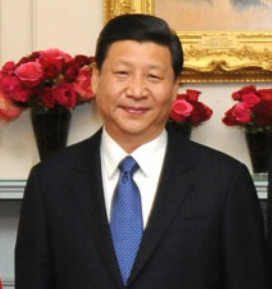
Xi Jinping, Chinese leader, adopted "Chinese Dream" as a slogan in 2013.

Shortly after becoming General Secretary of the Chinese Communist Party in late 2012, Xi announced a political slogan that developed into a major theme of administration discourse: "Realizing the great rejuvenation of the Chinese nation is the greatest dream of the Chinese nation in modern times." Formulated by Wang Huning, Xi's Chinese Dream is described as achieving the Two Centenaries: the material goal of China becoming a "moderately well-off society" by 2021, the 100th anniversary of the Chinese Communist Party, and the modernization goal of China becoming a fully developed nation by about 2049, the 100th anniversary of the founding of the People's Republic.

Xi's initial formulation of the Chinese Dream concept was later expanded, and published in English as:

The Chinese dream, after all, is the dream of the people.

We must realize it by closely depending on the people. We must incessantly bring benefits to the people.

Realizing the great renewal of the Chinese nation is the greatest dream for the Chinese nation in modern history.

Xi's view is that "China is in the best development period since modern times and the world is in a state of the profound change on a scale unseen in a century." On this belief, Xi contends that "time and momentum are on China's side" citing: (1) the accelerating rise of emerging and developing countries, (2) the rate of new technologies replacing old ones, and (3) changing patterns of global governance.

Xi's use of the slogan ties national and personal prosperity together to evoke a patriotic goal based on Chinese peoples' efforts to build better lives for their families. In May 2013, Xi Jinping called upon young people "to dare to dream, work assiduously to fulfill the dreams and contribute to the revitalization of the nation." He called upon all levels of the Party and the government to facilitate favorable conditions for their career development. Xi told young people to "cherish the glorious youth, strive with pioneer spirit and contribute their wisdom and energy to the realization of the Chinese dream."

In 2013, the International Department of the Chinese Communist Party published The Roadmap of the 18th CPC National Congress and the China Dream, which sought to explain the China Dream concept to foreign audiences. It contended that Chinese culture had been "structurally disadvantaged" from a global perspective, but now Chinese culture "walks abroad."

According to an opinion piece by Robert Lawrence Kuhn, published by China's state-controlled newspaper China Daily, the Chinese Dream has four parts: "strong China", "civilized China", "harmonious China", and "beautiful China". Khun states, "the Chinese dream is described as achieving the 'Two 100s'", a concept promoted by Xi Jinping, adding, "The material goal of China becoming a 'moderately well-off society' by about 2020" and "The modernization goal of China becoming a fully developed nation by about 2050".

The Economist reported that Xi "had seen the American dream up close, having spent a couple of weeks in 1985 with a rural family in Iowa. (He revisited them later during a trip to America as leader-in-waiting.)" Since the idea was put forward by Xi in November 2012 and repeated by him on numerous important occasions, the CCP's propaganda chief, Liu Yunshan, has directed that the concept of the Chinese Dream be incorporated into school textbooks.

In an article for the Huffington Post, French sinologist David Gosset (高大伟) presented the idea that the so-called "Liyuan Style" is an illustration of the China Dream. Gosset said that China's new First Lady Peng Liyuan is at the intersection of what he labeled "Modern China," "Civilizational China", and "Global China".

Xi's discourse of the China Dream incorporates intangible cultural heritages such as the production of clay figurines in the style of Qing-era craftsman Clayman Zhang.

== Interpretations ==
The Chinese Dream is vaguely defined, and has led to multiple interpretations describing the phrase's meaning. Although the content of the Chinese Dream is described variously, the phrase generally describes a set of aspirational qualities, values, and goals for the Chinese nation and people. Varying historical interpretations have tied it to ideas including the Confucian tradition and the May Fourth Movement. Xi's articulation of the China Dream has led to an outpouring of commentary.

=== Economic and political reform ===
The core task of the China Dream is economic development. The primary means of developing the economy pursuant to the China dream is infrastructure development, including via the Belt and Road Initiative.

Some government officials and activists view the Chinese Dream as a need for economic and political reform. Sustaining China's economic growth requires economic reform encompassing urbanization, the reduction of government bureaucracy, and weakening the power of special interests. Chinese liberals have defined the Chinese Dream as a dream of constitutionalism. Southern Weekly, a liberal newspaper based in Guangzhou, attempted to publish an editorial titled "The Chinese dream: a dream of constitutionalism" which advocated the separation of powers, but was censored by the authorities.

Both Xi Jinping and Premier Li Keqiang support economic reform, but have shied away from discussing political reform. Premier Li has said that "But however deep the water may be, we will wade into the water. This is because we have no alternative. Reform concerns the destiny of our country and the future of our nation." According to official CCP sources, the Chinese Dream is the "essence of Socialism with Chinese characteristics."

In October 2013, Britain's Chancellor of the Exchequer, George Osborne, described the Chinese Dream as a political reform that includes "rebalancing from investment to consumption."

Financial inclusion is an important component of Xi's view of the Chinese Dream.

=== Sustainable development ===
The China Dream has been defined as sustainable development. Peggy Liu and the NGO JUCCCE coined the phrase "China Dream" as a movement based on sustainability, which was later popularized in China through a New York Times article and adopted by Xi Jinping. Pollution and food safety are significant concerns in China. China's rising middle class is expected to increase by 500 million people by 2025 and will continue to put a strain on the country's dwindling resources. Xi Jinping's conception of the Chinese Dream has incorporated the idea of ecological civilization and increased its prominence.

According to Liu, the Chinese Dream of sustainability can be achieved through the promotion of green technologies and the reduction of widespread conspicuous consumption. China's high growth has caused widespread environmental damage, and without environmental reforms, the deterioration could threaten the legitimacy of the CCP. The Chinese Dream is a dream of a prosperous lifestyle reconciled with a sustainable lifestyle. According to academic Zhang Yiwu's articulation, "Chinese citizens have expressed a desire for both continued economic development and increased environmental protection. People need both cars and blue skies. How to achieve a balance between these two interests is a long-term challenge for the government."

=== Foreign policy ===
Xi's emphasis on the Chinese Dream also relates to his call to develop a Community of Shared Future for Mankind. foreign policy concept as part of its effort to build relationships with a network of like-minded foreign partners in order to facilitate the Chinese Dream. Chinese diplomat Wu Jianmin described the concept as "about the rejuvenation of China; democracy; cultural strength and harmony and it is not just a dream for China but for the world."

In diplomatic discourse, the China Dream is generally framed more ambiguously than in domestic-oriented discourse. Among occasions when the Chinese Dream has been part of diplomatic discourse are the 2015 visit by Premier Li Keqiang to Latin America, where he stated that sharing the Chinese Dream with Latin America will promote "mutual learning in the fields of culture, education, and society". During her time as Vice Foreign Minister, Fu Ying asserted, "The Chinese Dream is also part of the dream of many in the developing world who now have a great opportunity to grow their economy."

=== Military ===
The Chinese Dream is sometimes tied to the idea of a strong military. In 2010, Liu Mingfu advocated for a Chinese Dream of a strong military. In November 2013, China's first aircraft carrier, the Liaoning, bore the words "Chinese Dream, Strong Military Dream." "Aircraft carrier dream" is also a related slogan.

=== Ethnic nationalist revival ===
The Chinese Dream has been viewed as a call for China's rising international influence. Xi Jinping refers to the dream as a form of national rejuvenation. Young Chinese are envious of America's cultural influence and hope that China could one day rival the US as a cultural exporter.

The Chinese Dream is also a process to promote national rejuvenation through domestic ethnic policy. The adoption of Chinese nationalistic ideologies has increased as policies in line with the Chinese Dream have been enacted. Zheng Dahua has noted that the increase in domestic public concern surrounding the Chinese identity and connected to the self-consciousness movement in country. Dahua argues that the Chinese Dream has been internalized within the consciousness of the domestic public and as a result, nationalistic attitudes and opinions in China have subsequently increased.

==== Second-generation minzu policy in 2012 ====
The purpose of the second-generation ethnic policy is to cooperate with the ethnic assimilation project as part of the "national rejuvenation" to create a whole "Chinese nation-state." Some scholars suggest the first-generation of policy focuses on the recognition of 56 nationality (minzu) and on keeping the national unity while developing all groups. The second-generation ethnic policy was originally introduced in line with Xi Jinping's "national rejuvenation" theory of the Chinese dream. It was first proposed in 2011 by two Chinese scholars of National Conditions Institute of Tsinghua University, Hu Lianhe and Hu Angang.

Hu Lianhe and Hu Angang suggest that the proof of multiculturalism in the US, Brazil, and India adopting the model of the "ethnic melting pot" can prove the correctness of second-generation ethnic policies in China.

==== "Ethnic mingling" after 2014 ====
The new policy of "ethnic mingling" (jiaorong) proposed by Xi in 2014 is an assimilation policy based on "national integration" and "national unity." Xi attended the Second Xinjiang Work Forum, and stressed that:

We must strengthen the interaction, interchange and intermingling between ethnic groups; we must prepare and expand all kinds of shared constructive projects, advance "bilingual education" and promote the building of social structures and community environments in which the people of different ethnic groups are mutually embedded.

The Forum's full set of document have not been made public. In his speech, Xi emphasized the term "national integration" many times. His goal is to establish a unified national identity between each ethnic group and to replace ethnic identities with the Zhonghua minzu. The substance of the "ethnic mingling" policy is a step in addition to the theory of the "melting pot" of the second-generation ethnic policy. For Xi, the creation of the unified identity of the Chinese nation is a key factor in realizing the great rejuvenation of Chinese Dream; however, some scholars argue that the national revival campaign will make China lose cultural diversity and "indigeneity" (tuzhuxing).

==== Persecution of Uyghurs in China ====
Some scholars, journalists, and governments claim that the "ethnic mingling" policy implementation by the government evolved into cultural genocide against minorities in Xinjiang since 2017, most prominently against the Uyghurs. The period from 2017 to 2020 is the stage when the government took tough measures to implement the assimilation of ethnic minorities. These scholars claim that cultural genocide is a stage to deepen destruction of the group identity of ethnic minorities. Article 14 was the new regulations to lay the foundations to establish mass internment "re-education" system. The Chinese government promulgated new regulations on the grounds of "de-extremification of Muslims" in Article 14.

Since 2014, the trial implementation of intermarriage project established in some places of Xinjiang. The local government of Qiemo County in Xinjiang established a new regulation in 2014, called "Regarding the Incentive Measures for Families Encouraging Intermarriage Between Ethnic Minorities and Han." This policy is very generous with regard to ethnic-Han intermarriage families, with priority consideration and resolution in politics, housing, and children's employment, including a 10,000 yuan award each year for no more than five consecutive years and free tuition for their children from elementary school to high school, etc. County CCP Secretary Zhu Xin remarked:

Our advocacy of intermarriage is promoting positive energy ... Only by promoting the establishment of a social structure and community environment in which all ethnic groups are embedded in each other ... can we boost the great unity, ethnic fusion and development of all ethnic groups in Xinjiang, and finally realize our China dream of great rejuvenation of our Chinese nation

James A. Millward, a scholar of Xinjiang at Georgetown University, stated that "state-sponsored efforts at 'blending' and 'fusion' will be seen by Uyghurs in China or by China's critics anywhere as really aimed at assimilating Uighurs into Han culture."

=== Other social issues ===
Zhang Gaoli, as Vice-Premier, stated that the Chinese Dream also belongs to the millions of disabled people in China.

Provincial versions of the Chinese Dream, such as the "Henan Dream" or the "Guangdong Dream" have also been expressed.

=== Individual dreams ===
Some Chinese have interpreted the Chinese dream as the pursuit of individual dreams. Evan Osnos of The New Yorker comments that "Xi Jinping has sought to inspire his people by raising the flag of the China Dream, but they have interpreted it as China Dreams—plural." According to Osnos, the Chinese Dream is "the proliferation of 1.3 billion China Dreams."

According to Shi Yuzhi, a professor at the National University of Singapore, the Chinese Dream is not about individual glory, but about collective effort. Measuring public sentiment on Sina Weibo, Academic Christopher Marquis and Zoe Yang found that the Chinese Dream refers more to the common goods bestowed by civil society than it does to individual achievements.

A main aim of the Chinese state propaganda is therefore the construction of links between individual and national aspirations, which also signifies the convergence of the values of the market economy and state nationalism. This is evident in Chinese entertainment television. In a genre of reality shows in public speaking, for example, contestants frequently connect between their "dreams" and the triumph of China and further emphasize the legitimacy of the CCP in delivering a better future.

=== Compared to the American Dream ===
State media in China sometimes contrasts the Chinese Dream with the American Dream, contending for example that while the Chinese Dream seeks national rejuvenation, "the characteristic of the American Dream is the maximization of private benefit, and the profit motive is its driving force. So-called universal values are applied selectively according to US interests."

In 2015, Xi stated, "I have the impression that the Americans and people in all other countries share the same dream about the future: world peace, social security and stability, and a decent life .... The dreams of various peoples, however different in meaning, are sources of inspiration for them and all these dreams create important opportunities for China and the United States, as well as other countries to engage in cooperation."

According to Shi Yuzhi, a professor at the National University of Singapore, the Chinese Dream is about Chinese prosperity, collective effort, socialism, and national glory. Shi compared the relationship between the phrase and the American Dream.

Academic Suisheng Zhao writes that the conceptualization of "[t]he Chinese Dream is thus distinguished from the American dream in that people can pursue individual dreams and contribute to the national dream at the same time." In contrast to the individualist American Dream, the Chinese Dream is expressed as a collective desire for China to reclaim its historical role as a major power.

== Reactions ==
Some scholars argue that the Chinese Dream slogan, and its connection to morality and tradition, is a method for constructing CCP legitimacy.

In October 2015, Roderick MacFarquhar, a China expert at Harvard University, spoke at a conference on Marxism in Beijing. He said that Chinese leader Xi Jinping's talk of the so-called "Chinese Dream" was "not the intellectually coherent, robust and wide-ranging philosophy needed to stand up to Western ideas."

Ravi Kant, a financial writer, commented on Asia Times that Xi Jinping himself is hindering the Chinese people from realizing their dreams. He said that much of Xi's rise can be attributed to his belief in fajia, which emphasizes absolute power and authority of the ruler. He compared and contrasted Xi to Deng Xiaoping, who he said believed in empowering people instead of leaders, and whose policy contributed to China's economic rise. Kant said, "The only man standing between the Chinese people and the Chinese dream is Xi Jinping."

Former United States Secretary of State John Kerry promoted the idea of a "Pacific Dream" to accommodate China's rise through regional collaboration over shared interests like the environment and economic growth.

Derek Hird, a China expert at Lancaster University, said that Xi Jinping has built Confucian values, including conservative views of Chinese women's role in the family, into his Chinese Dream of nationalist revival. The Wall Street Journal reported that in the Xi era, new political slogans emphasizing "family, family education and family virtues" or "pass on the red gene" have come along with efforts to censor voices on women's rights.

According to some commentators, the "great rejuvenation of the Chinese nation" (中华民族伟大复兴), on which the Chinese Dream is based, is a mistranslation. A better translation of the phrase would be the "great rejuvenation of the Chinese race". Jamil Anderlini, an editor for the Financial Times, said that the concept of "Chinese race" (or "Chinese Volk") nominally includes 56 officially recognized ethnicities (including Tibetans and Uyghurs) in China, but is "almost universally understood to mean the majority Han ethnic group, who make up more than 90 per cent of the population." He said that such race-based ideas are deeply connected to the history of the 20th century and earlier European colonialism.

Survey data compiled by academic Bruce Dickson indicates that around 70% of the Chinese population approve of the Chinese Dream. Through a survey of 17 Chinese cities, academic Lu Chunlong concludes that the Chinese Dream is generally understood through "Chinese traditional culture: respect for political authority, desire for social order and support for a powerful government." Lu's study also found that 92.4% of those surveyed had heard of Xi's explanation of the China Dream.

== See also ==
- Ideology of the Chinese Communist Party
- Chinese nationalism § Xi Jinping and the "Chinese Dream"
- Chinese unification
- Chinese Century
- Pax Sinica
- American Dream
