= Welcome to Macintosh (film) =

- Original poster art
- Directed by: Robert Baca; Josh Rizzo
- Starring: Wayne Bibbens; Vince Briel; Charles DeVore; Richard Halsey; Andy Hertzfeld
- Production company: Baca Productions
- Release dates: April 6, 2008 (Wisconsin Film Festival); December 15, 2008
- Running time: 83 minutes (DVD); 73 minutes (VOD Services)
- Country: United States
- Language: English

Welcome to Macintosh is a 2008 documentary film focusing on computer company Apple Inc. and its Macintosh line of computers. The title comes from the original welcome message shown during the start-up of Macintosh computers.

== Synopsis ==
The film focuses on the history of computer company Apple Inc., and its Macintosh line of computers specifically. It discusses the company's employees, philosophy, practices, and interviews people who were working at Apple when the Macintosh was first released.

== Production ==
Ars Technica noted that neither Steve Jobs nor Steve Wozniak, the founders of Apple Inc., appear in the film. However, several notable figures in the history of the Macintosh appear in the film, including Mac engineers Andy Hertzfeld and Jim Reekes, former Apple Evangelist Guy Kawasaki, and Ron Wayne, a "short-lived but original co-founder of Apple Computer".

== Release ==
Welcome to Macintosh was shown at five film festivals. The film's studio released a trailer on YouTube on November 29, 2008. The movie was released on DVD on December 15, 2008, and includes three hours of extra and deleted scenes. In early 2009, the studio setup group screenings for the film with seven Mac and Apple user groups in seven American cities (Rockville, Maryland; Minneapolis, Minnesota; Scottsdale, Arizona; Nashville, Tennessee; Washington, D.C.; Indianapolis, Indiana; and Providence, Rhode Island), which include more than 700 people who signed up to attend the events.

== Reception ==
Technology website Ars Technica describes Welcome to Macintosh as a film that "mixes history, criticism and an unapologetic revelry of all things Apple", and wrote, "If you liked Pirates of Silicon Valley or read Revolution in the Valley, then this film is for you." After watching the film, Apple Inc. co-founder Steve Wozniak was pleased with the results, and appreciated how "unbelievable" it was to see people "say that great of things about [him]". He also noted that the film was "so on the mark", and that it was the best independent film regarding Apple that he has seen.

== See also ==
- Pirates of Silicon Valley, a 1999 film about the Microsoft versus Apple rivalry
- Triumph of the Nerds, a 1996 television documentary movie about development of the personal computer
- The Social Network, a 2010 film about the founding of Facebook
- Revolution OS, a 2001 film about the history of open- versus closed-source software
