= Golden Triangle of Meat-packing =

Industrial concentration in southwestern Kansas

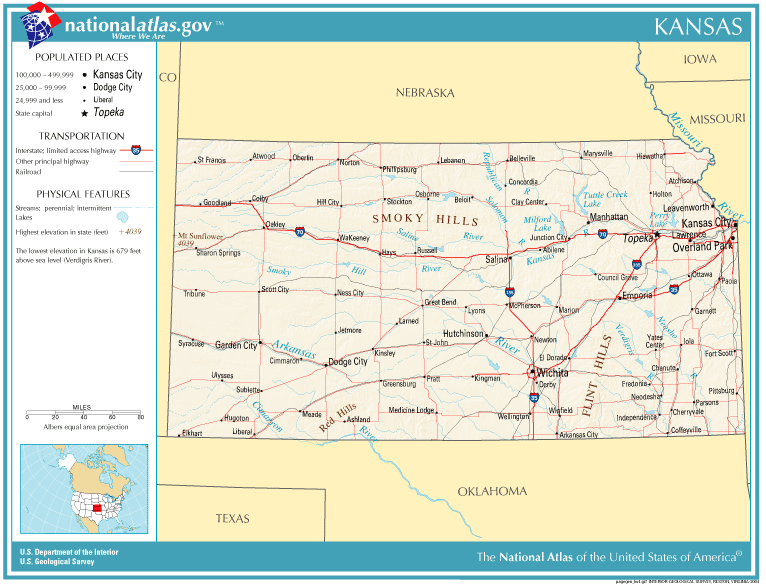
Kansas

The Golden Triangle of Meat-packing or Golden Triangle of Beef refers to the influence of meat-packing in three southwestern Kansas counties and their principal cities: Dodge City, Garden City, and Liberal. While population decreased in many counties in western Kansas during the 20th century, these three cities and their environs experienced population increases from 1980 to 2020. The increases were primarily due to employment opportunities at four large slaughterhouses and meat-packing plants.

In response to meatpacking industry demand, and migrating due to the loss of the Vietnam War, Vietnamese and Lao immigrants arrived in the 1970s and 1980s. However, many upwardly-mobile members of these groups left the area by the late 1980s. Subsequently, Mexican and Central American immigrants were recruited by the plants. By the 2020s, the large majority of the employees at the meat packing plants were Hispanic. Unlike the rest of the state, Hispanics are the majority of the population of these three counties plus one adjacent county.

== The industry ==
Until the mid 20th century, the meat-packing industry usually moved live cattle or carcasses by rail from producing areas to meat-packing facilities near large cities such as Chicago and Kansas City. This began to change in the 1960s, as companies began to move slaughterhouses and meat-packing plants to where cattle were raised. Southwestern Kansas was attractive to the meat-packing companies because of an abundance of groundwater obtainable from the Ogallala Aquifer. The abundance of water permitted irrigation to be used for growing large quantities of animal feed. Precipitation in this "Dust Bowl" region is sometimes inadequate for agriculture. The increased production of animal feed permitted the establishment of large feedlots in which cattle could be collected and fattened before being sent to slaughterhouses. Finally, the slaughterhouses themselves needed large quantities of water, estimated at 800 U.S. gal (3,000 L) of water for each butchered animal. (The Ogallala Aquifer is being depleted, with one estimate that it will be dry in the Golden Triangle region about 2040.)

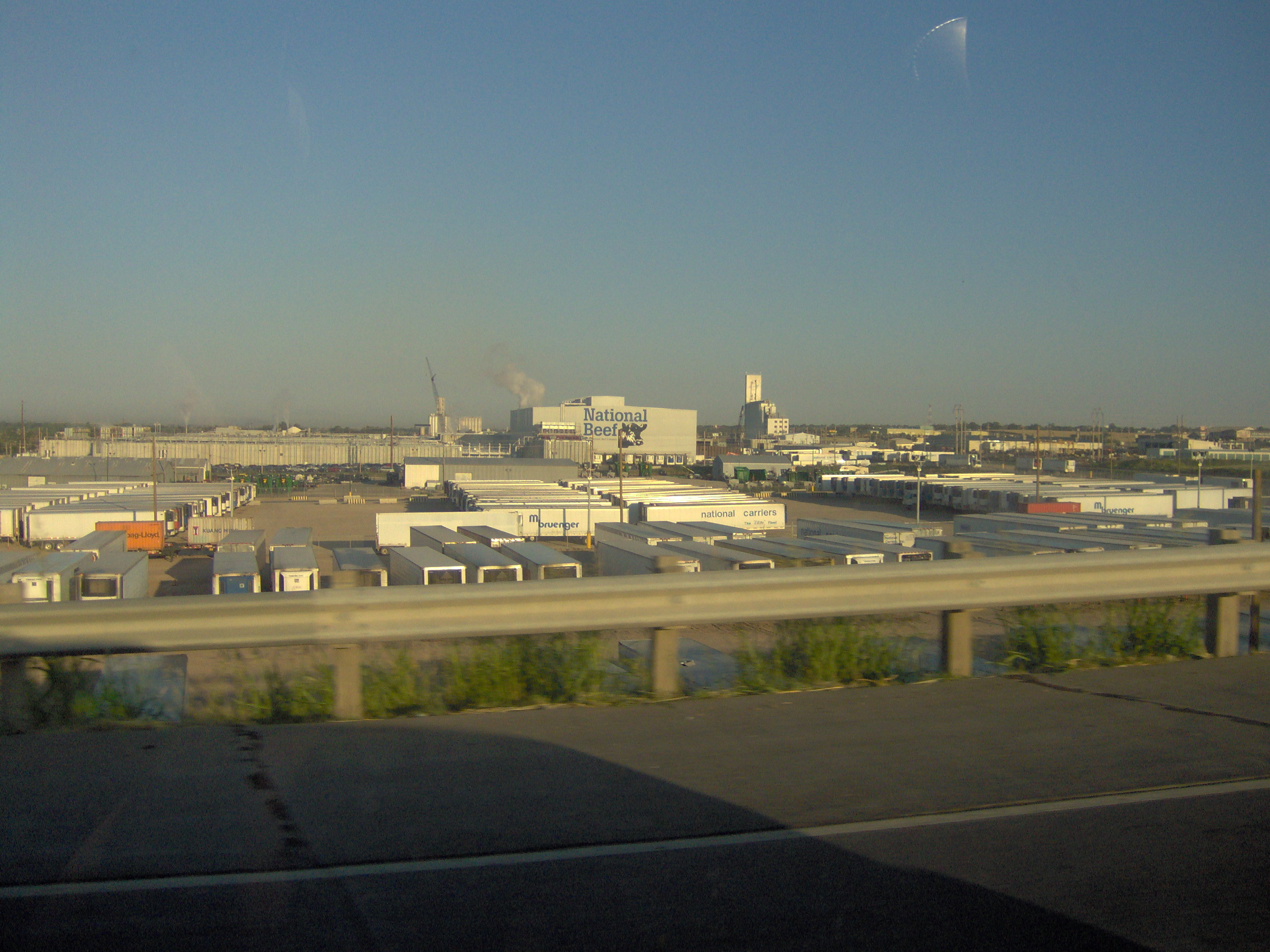
The National Beef Plant in Dodge City.

In 1980, Iowa Beef Packers (known as IBP) opened what was then the world's largest beef packing plant in Holcomb, Kansas, 10 miles (16 km) west of Garden City. The plant employs 3,600 people and slaughters 6,000 cattle every day. The facility is now owned by Tyson Foods. Finney County induced the company to locate the plant near Garden City by providing the company with $100 million in industrial revenue bonds and $3.5 million in property tax relief. In 1983, a small meat packing plant in Garden City, later owned by ConAgra, began expanding and eventually employed 2,300 people. The plant burned down in 2000 and has never reopened.

The two largest employers in Ford County (Dodge City) are National Beef with 2,950 employees and Cargill Meat Solutions, 2,700 employees. National Beef purchased a large Dodge City slaughterhouse in 1992. Cargill began operations in Dodge City in 1979 and its plant eventually reached a capacity of slaughtering and processing 6,000 cattle per day. National Beef also owns and operates a slaughterhouse and beef packing plant in Liberal with a capacity of processing 6,000 cattle per day and employing about 3,500 people. That number of employees comprises about one-third of the total employed work force in Seward County where Liberal is located.

By the mid-1990s, the meat-packing industry in the Golden Triangle was slaughtering 23,500 cattle daily. As the ConAgra plant in Garden City burned down in 2000, the 21st century capacity is somewhat lower.

== Population ==
The three counties with large meat packing plants are among the four counties in Kansas with a majority Hispanic population. Grant, the fourth county with a majority of Hispanics, is also in southwest Kansas, but has several vegetable processing plants rather than a large packing plant. The employees at the meat-packing plants in these three counties comprise about two-thirds of the total employees of meat-packing plants in Kansas. The majority of workers at meat-packing plants are foreign-born Hispanics. Nationally, 66.8 percent of meat-packing employees are Hispanic, and 56 percent of all workers are foreign-born. By contrast with the heavily Hispanic and foreign-born population of the Golden Triangle counties, Hispanics make up only 13.02 percent of the total population of Kansas.

| County | City | 1980 total population | 2020 total population | 2020 Hispanic population | Hispanic percentage of population | Number of meat-packing plant employees |
|---|---|---|---|---|---|---|
| Finney | Garden City | 23,825 | 38,470 | 19,883 | 51.68% | 3,600 |
| Ford | Dodge City | 24,315 | 34,287 | 19,666 | 57.36% | 5,700 |
| Grant | Ulysses | 6,977 | 7,352 | 3,862 | 52.53% | - |
| Seward | Liberal | 17,071 | 21,964 | 14,406 | 65.59% | 3,500 |

Texas County, a neighboring county in Oklahoma, in 2020 was the only Hispanic-majority county in the state and also had a large meat-processing plant.

== Labor ==
While the establishment of a large meat-packing industry in southwest Kansas was facilitated by the abundance of water, animal feed, feedlots, and local governments offering incentives to investors, there was no similar abundance of labor in the small cities and towns of the region. Unemployment was low; the population was largely non-Hispanic white; and most Anglos were not interested in the hard and dangerous work associated with a meat-packing plant. As one commentator said, "Your Anglo community is not going to work there, pretty much regardless of the wage. The entire meatpacking industry depends on immigrant labor, and always has."

In the 1980s, IBP recruited workers from far and wide for its Garden City plant, including 2,000 former refugees from Southeast Asia, mostly Vietnamese. In the 1990s, IBP opened an office in Mexico City to recruit Mexican and Central American workers. By 2000, Hispanics comprised 77 percent of IPB's work force in Garden City. In February 2023, a company hired to clean the Cargill meat-packing plant in Dodge City was fined for employing 26 underage workers, aged 13 to 17, in the plant.

== Social and economic impacts ==
In 2007, a scholar summed up the social impacts of the packing plants: "influx of immigrants and refugees, housing shortages, rising demands for social services, increases in various social disorders, the creation of lots of relatively low-paying or part-time jobs, and relative falls in income levels." He pointed out also that these same issues characterize the meat-packing industry whatever its location. In Garden City, Spanish speaking children made up more than one-half of the school population and Mexican-owned businesses abounded. In 2006, Pew Research Center estimated that 27 percent of the employees of meat processing plants nationwide were undocumented aliens. Several raids by immigration officers on meat-packing facilities elsewhere ignited fears of the same in the Golden Triangle, but large-scale raids never occurred.

Overall, however, problems associated with the rapid growth of an immigrant population have either not been serious or have been overcome. In 2018, Deborah and James Fallows titled an article about Dodge City, "A Conservative Town Embraces its Immigrant Population, Documented or Undocumented." They quoted a researcher of the Center for Rural Affairs stating that “Latinos and immigrants are not only bringing population growth to rural America, they are also bringing economic growth... Economists have found that, nationwide, rural counties with larger proportions of Latino populations tend to be better off economically than those with smaller Latino populations. Rural counties with higher proportions of Latinos tend to have lower unemployment rates and higher average per capita incomes.”

In 2021, a Hispanic woman and second-generation immigrant was elected to the City Commission in Liberal and another Hispanic, also a second-generation immigrant, ran for the City Commission of Dodge City. A Hispanic man, born in Mexico and undocumented (although a DACA recipient), is the Deputy City Manager of Dodge City. In 2022, several department heads in the Garden City government have Hispanic surnames. Garden City's first Hispanic mayor was elected in 1973.

== Muslim immigrants ==
In 2006, Muslims from Somalia, Burma, Sudan, and Ethiopia began arriving in Garden City and in 2021 they were joined by a few Afghans. In 2022, one thousand Muslims were estimated to live in Garden City, and most of the adults worked in the meat-packing plant. In 2016, three men from near Garden City were arrested for plotting to bomb a makeshift mosque in an apartment complex largely occupied by Muslims. The three men were sentenced to 25, 26, and 30 years imprisonment.

== See also ==
- Animal–industrial complex
- Concentrated animal feeding operation
- Meat industry
