= American Review =

American Review may refer to the following publications:

- American Review (literary journal), published 1967–1977, formerly known as New American Review
- The American Review (literary journal), a literary journal edited by Seward Collins 1933–1937
- American Review (political journal), an Internet-based academic journal of politics published by the United States Studies Centre at the University of Sydney in Australia
- The American Review: A Whig Journal, a monthly periodical published 1844–1852, also known as The American Review
- North American Review, the first literary magazine in the United States
