= Dreaming in Code =

- First edition
- Author: Scott Rosenberg
- Subject: Computer programming
- Publisher: Crown Publishers
- Publication date: 2007
- Publication place: United States
- Media type: Hardcover
- Pages: 400 pp
- ISBN: 1-4000-8246-3
- OCLC: 70174970
- Dewey Decimal: 005.1/ROSENBERG
- LC Class: QA76.76.D47 R668 2007

Dreaming in Code: Two Dozen Programmers, Three Years, 4,732 Bugs, and One Quest for Transcendent Software is a (2007) Random House literary nonfiction book by Salon.com editor and journalist Scott Rosenberg. It documents the workers of Mitch Kapor's Open Source Applications Foundation as they struggled with collaboration and the software development task of building the open source calendar application Chandler.

Rosenberg spent time observing the organization at work and wrote about its milestones and problems. The book combines narrative with explanations of software development philosophy, methodology, and process, referring to The Mythical Man-Month and other texts of the field. In a review published in the Atlantic, James Fallows compared the book to Tracy Kidder's The Soul of a New Machine.

At the time of the book's publication, OSAF had not yet released Chandler 1.0. Chandler 1.0 was released on August 8, 2008.
