= Eazel =

Software company

- Industry: Software development
- Founded: August 1999; 27 years ago in Mountain View, California
- Founder: Andy Hertzfeld
- Defunct: May 15, 2001; 25 years ago
- Fate: Defunct
- Headquarters: Mountain View, California, United States
- Key people: Andy Hertzfeld, Bud Tribble, Mike Boich, Darin Adler, Bart Decrem, Susan Kare
- Number of employees: 75 (2001)
- Website: Eazel.com at the Wayback Machine (archived May 10, 2000)

Eazel was an American software company operating from 1999 to 2001 in Palo Alto and then Mountain View, California. The company's flagship product was the Nautilus file manager for the GNOME desktop environment on Linux, which was immediately adopted and maintained by the free software movement. As the core of Eazel's business model, it was an early example of cloud storage services in the form of personal file storage, transparently and portably stored on the Internet.

== History ==
Eazel was founded by Andy Hertzfeld in August 1999 in Mountain View, California. It had 22 initial employees and raised US$12 million from several venture capital investment companies. Initially, all the programmers worked on every aspect of the product and eventually specialized on its components.

The company grew from 22 employees in 1999 to 75 employees in 2001 and was named one of the top 10 companies to watch among "earsplitting buzz surrounding Linux", by Red Herring magazine.

Staff consisted of former employees of many technology companies such as Apple, Netscape, Be Inc., Linuxcare, Microsoft, Red Hat, and Sun Microsystems. Mike Boich was CEO, having been a major figure at Apple and co-founder of Radius; Bud Tribble was VP of Engineering, having been software manager and a designer of the original Macintosh project; Andy Hertzfeld was a principal designer, having been a lead software engineer and a designer of the original Macintosh project; Darin Adler led development, having been the technical lead for System 7 for the Macintosh; and Susan Kare designed new vector graphics-based iconography, having designed the original Macintosh icons. Other staff included programmer Maciej Stachowiak, who was a programmer and board member for GNOME; and board member Michael Homer, formerly of Apple, AOL, and Netscape.

Eazel's primary product was the Nautilus file manager for the GNOME desktop environment. In developing Nautilus, the company addressed several challenges, including building complex user-facing software across multiple Linux distributions, integrating with the existing GNOME open-source community, and operating within a relatively small market for Linux desktop users. It also explored ways to generate revenue from free software by offering related services to customers.

Eazel focused on GNOME rather than KDE, partly due to concerns at the time regarding the licensing of the Qt toolkit on which KDE was based.

One thing that's different from us and a lot of the Linux hackers is that on our team we have a lot of people with a lot experience coming up with user interfaces without any prior example. ... It's hard to decide how much to copy and borrow, how much to invent, and how to make it all consistent. ... This is an issue for the whole GNOME project. We don't want to make Nautilus this weirdo program that's different from the rest of the system. We really feel like something we've barely started on is helping ratchet up the whole community into understanding how to do better user interfaces. Right now, the numbers [of Linux desktop users] are so small, there's huge room for improvement. They're small for a reason. [Existing Linux desktop software] doesn't have the properties that would make it nice for the desktop, to make it an obvious choice. ... Some of the revolutionary work we do will not only make it possible, but compelling.

— Darin Adler, project lead of Nautilus at Eazel

In December 2000, Dell invested a "substantial stake" in Eazel and committed to preloading Nautilus on its Linux-based desktop and laptop systems, while Eazel preannounced its core business services which were woven directly into the free Nautilus application. Described as the "network user experience", those services were the Software Catalog to aid users in locating and installing applications, and Eazel Online Storage for easily storing and browsing files via their desktop or web browser.

The company failed to successfully monetize, or to secure more funding before venture capital ran out, and the technology market changed drastically in the two years of the company's lifespan. On March 13, 2001, Eazel simultaneously launched the first release of Nautilus (version 1.0), and laid off most of its 75 employees in an attempt to secure funding in its final few months. The company attempted to sell its core development group but ceased operations on May 15, 2001.

Hertzfeld arranged a meeting with Steve Jobs and most of Apple's high level management. In June 2001, most of Eazel's final roster of senior engineers joined Apple's Safari team, including Bud Tribble, Lisa Melton, Darin Adler, John Sullivan, Ken Kocienda, and Maciej Stachowiak.

=== Legacy ===
The Nautilus file manager was received positively, and has been incorporated into GNOME since GNOME version 1.4. GNOME has renamed Nautilus to Files and now refers to some of Eazel's early concept of "network user experience" as "cloud storage", which is provisioned by a variety of sources including the complimentary Google Drive. Files is continuously maintained by the free software movement as a centerpiece of some free Linux-based desktop environments.

== See also ==
- History of free and open-source software#Desktop (1984–present)
- Chandler, a defunct free software PIM app
- Taligent and Kaleida Labs, previous software spinoffs by Apple veterans, via the AIM alliance
