= Darin Adler =

Apple Inc. employee

- Employers: ICOM Simulations; Apple Inc.; General Magic; Eazel
- Spouse: Diane Patterson (former)
- Website: bentspoon.com/darin/

Darin Adler is a senior engineering manager for Apple and a frequent speaker at Apple's Worldwide Developers Conference and Stump the Experts panelist.

As of 2007, he is the engineering manager of the Safari Web browser team at Apple, which also develops the WebKit framework. Adler was part of the original team that shipped Safari's beta releases and 1.0 release, as well as Safari 3.0 beta for Microsoft Windows.

He was the technical lead for Apple's System 7 operating system release. During 1985–1987 he worked for ICOM Simulations as primary developer of the MacVenture game engine which ran Déjà Vu, Uninvited, and Shadowgate. Adler went on to work at General Magic and Eazel.

== See also ==
- Andy Hertzfeld
- Blue Meanies (Apple Computer)
- Dave Hyatt
- GNOME
- Maciej Stachowiak
- MacVenture
