= Scott Rosenberg (journalist) =

American journalist (born 1959)

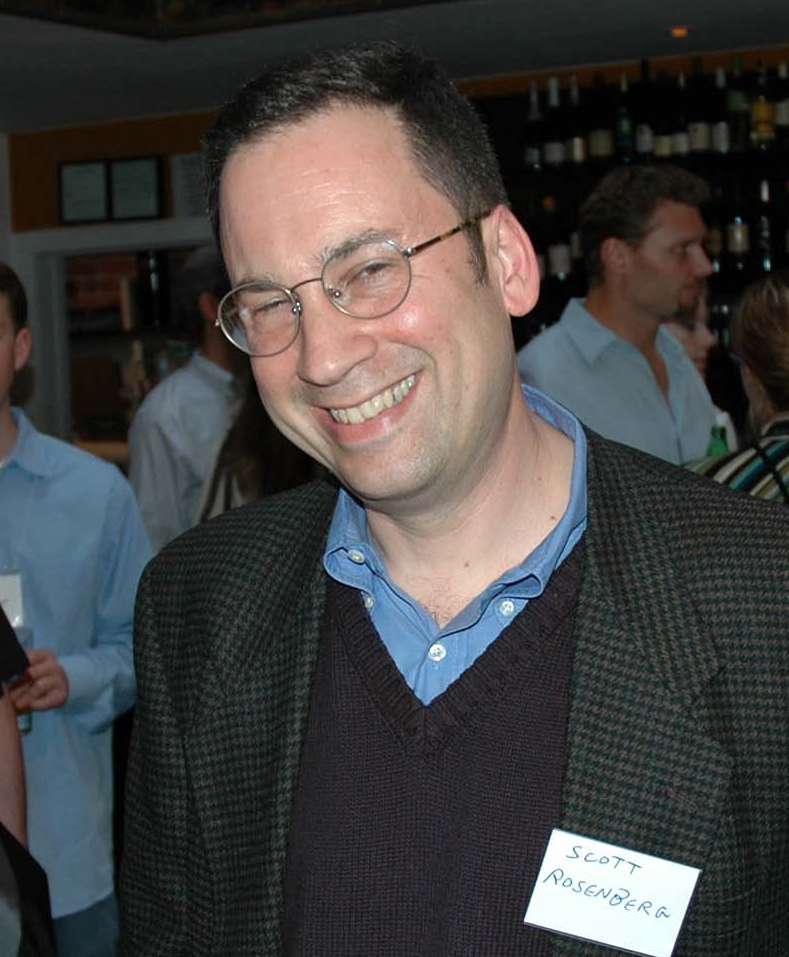
- Rosenberg at the Darknet book release party
- Born: 1959 (age 66–67); Queens, New York, US
- Education: Harvard University (AB)
- Occupations: Journalist, editor, blogger, author
- Notable credit(s): Salon.com, The San Francisco Examiner
- Spouse: Dayna Macy
- Children: 2
- Website: www.wordyard.com

Scott Rosenberg (born 1959 in Queens, New York, is an American journalist, editor, blogger and non-fiction author. He was a co-founder of Salon Media Group and Salon.com and a relatively early participant in The WELL. Since 2018, he has been the managing editor of technology at Axios.

== Early life and education ==
Rosenberg was born in Queens to Jeanne and Coleman Rosenberg. He attended Harvard University, where he graduated with a degree in history and literature. While at Harvard, he worked for The Harvard Crimson.

== Career ==
After working at The San Francisco Examiner, Rosenberg left the paper to found Salon.com in 1995. He served as the outlet's managing editor from 1999 to 2004, eventually leaving in 2007 to write Dreaming in Code. It offers a detailed perspective on collaboration and massive software endeavors, particularly the open source calendar application Chandler (PIM). His second book Say Everything, on the history of blogging, came out in 2009.

From 2011 to 2014, Rosenberg worked at Grist. In 2018, Rosenberg joined Axios as its managing editor of technology.

In 2010, Rosenberg founded MediaBugs.org, a "service for reporting specific, correctable errors and problems in media coverage". In an interview, he explains: "We'll try to alert the journalists or news organization involved about your report and bring them into a conversation," which may get the error corrected. It is funded by the John S. and James L. Knight Foundation as part of their News Challenge. In September 2012, at the end of the funding period, he stated in a blog post: "Much of the public sees media-outlet accuracy failures as 'not our problem.' The journalists are messing up, they believe, and it's the journalists' job to fix things."

== Personal life ==
He is married to Dayna Macy. The couple have two sons, Matthew and Jack. They live in Berkeley, California.
