= Ronald Wayne =

American businessperson and co-founder of Apple (born 1934)

- Wayne in 2026
- Born: Ronald Gerald Wayne; May 17, 1934 (age 92); Cleveland, Ohio, US
- Known for: Co-founding Apple

Ronald Gerald Wayne (born May 17, 1934) is an American retired electronics industry business executive. He co-founded Apple Computer Company—which later became simply Apple—as a partnership with Steve Wozniak and Steve Jobs on April 1, 1976, providing administrative oversight and documentation for the new venture. He has been often referred to by media as the 'forgotten founder' of Apple.

== Early life ==
Ronald Wayne was born in Cleveland, Ohio, on May 17, 1934. He trained as a technical draftsman at the School of Industrial Art High School in New York City.

== Career ==
In 1956, Wayne moved to California. In 1971, Wayne started his first business designing and manufacturing slot machines. This venture failed within its first year of operation.

=== Atari (1973–1976) ===
As Junior Designer, Wayne established the official documentation and materials control systems at Atari. This sophisticated cataloging and inventory tracking system dramatically improved Atari's manufacturing efficiency and eliminated substantial losses attributable to lost, duplicated, and mis-filed raw materials required to fabricate complete video game systems. The documentation system included operating instructions, circuit diagrams, and cabinet designs for all arcade games sold by Atari. As product development manager, he designed video game enclosures and led development of games such as Gran-Track Racing. His Atari tenure ended following the Warner Communications acquisition.

=== Apple (1976–1977) ===
In 1976, Wayne was well respected for his sophisticated and comprehensive internal corporate documentation systems at the three-year-old Atari. There, he met coworkers Steve Jobs and Steve Wozniak. To assist in mediation of one of their typically intense discussions about the design of computers and the future of the industry, Wayne invited the pair to his home to facilitate and advise them. In the ensuing two-hour conversation about technology and business, Jobs proposed the founding of a computer company led by Wozniak and himself. The two would each hold a 45% stake so that Wayne could receive a 10% stake to act as a tie-breaker in their decisions. As the venture's self-described "adult in the room" at age 41, Wayne drafted the original partnership agreement, and the three founded Apple Computer on April 1, 1976. Wayne created the first illustrations of the Apple logo (known as Apple Newton). He also wrote the Apple I Operations Manual.

Wayne's attitude concerning business was already risk-averse following his experience five years prior with the "very traumatic" failure of his slot machine business, the debts from which he had spent one year repaying. Jobs secured a $15,000 line of credit to purchase materials needed to fabricate Apple's first order placed by the Byte Shop, a business with a reputation as a notoriously slow-paying vendor. This created great anxiety in Wayne concerning his personal financial exposure. Legally, all members of a partnership are personally responsible for any debts incurred by any partner; unlike Jobs and Wozniak, then 21 and 25, Wayne had already acquired a sizable amount of personal assets that potential creditors could possibly seize. Furthermore, his passion was in original product engineering and in slot machines, and not in the documentation systems Jobs and Wozniak expected him to manage, possibly indefinitely at Apple. Believing he was "standing in the shadow of giants" of product-design and eager to shield himself from financial exposure, he exited the company. "Twelve days after Wayne created the document that formally created Apple, he returned to the county registrar's office filing an amendment formally withdrawing his name and involvement in the company". Some sources say that he created amendments to limit his liability and profits to 10% only for his 10% share of the new company and share 90% of profit or loss with Jobs and Wozniak. Wayne was later paid $800 (equivalent to $4,400 in 2024) in exchange for relinquishing his equity stake in the company, and one year later accepted additional payment $1,500 (equivalent to $8,300 in 2024) to forfeit any potential future claims against the newly incorporated company at Jobs' and Wozniak's request. The exact timeframe of this exit has been disputed by Steve Wozniak, who in an interview said that Wayne left the company after a few months.

Wayne has stated in the decades that followed, he does not regret selling his share of the company, as he made the "best decision based on the information available at the time". He remarked in an interview in April 2016 that his one regret was selling his copy of the original signed contract for $500. The same document was sold for $2.51 million many years later. He said he had truly believed that the Apple enterprise "would be successful, but at the same time there could be significant bumps along the way and I couldn't risk it. I had already had a rather unfortunate business experience. I was getting too old and those two men were whirlwinds. It was like having a tiger by the tail. I couldn't keep up with these guys." Although Apple ended up at one point becoming the most valuable company in the world, he said that given the risks and stress of staying with Apple he "probably would have wound up the richest man in the cemetery".

=== After Apple ===
Shortly after leaving Apple, Wayne resisted Jobs's attempts to get him to return, remaining at Atari until 1978, when he joined Lawrence Livermore National Laboratory and later Thor Electronics, an electronics manufacturing company in Salinas, California.

In the late 1970s, Wayne ran a stamp shop in Milpitas, California, for a short time. After several break-ins, he transferred his stamp operations to his home.

Steve Jobs approached him again as a business contact for Apple, but Wayne refused to forward Jobs's proposal to purchase a friend's company. Wayne believed that his friend should retain ownership of the company, supplying this technology to Apple under exclusive license instead of selling the business. Wayne later expressed regret for interfering with this decision instead of allowing the negotiations to be made directly between the parties.

== Media ==
Wayne appeared in the documentary Welcome to Macintosh in 2008, where he describes some of his early experiences with Jobs and Wozniak.

In July 2011, Wayne published a memoir titled Adventures of an Apple Founder. His plan for initial exclusivity on the Apple Books store did not materialize.

Wayne wrote and released a socioeconomic treatise titled Insolence of Office, released on October 1, 2011.

== Personal life ==
Wayne lives in Pahrump, Nevada.
