= David Gosset =

Sinologist

David Gosset (born May 23, 1970) is a global affairs analyst in international relations and sinologist. He established the Europe-China Forum, New Silk Road Initiative and China-Europe-America Global Initiative. He is the chairman of DG2CI, a consulting and communication firm.

== Background ==
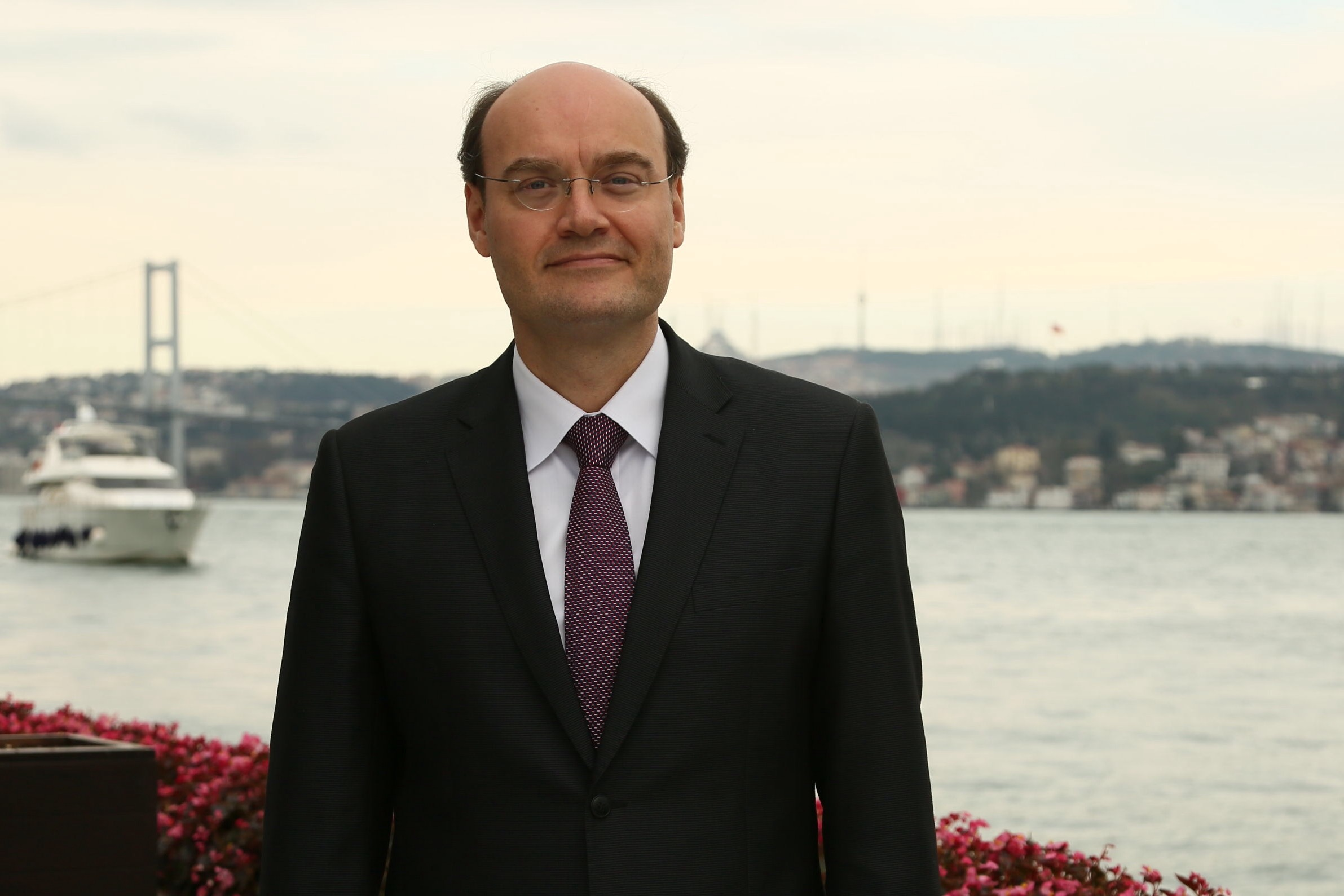
Dec 1 2016, David Gosset invited in Istanbul to discuss the New Silk Road strategy

David Gosset was born in Paris. He is known in China as 高大伟(pinyin : GAO DAWEI). A board member of several European companies and institutions with involvement in education, management, and industry, he advises companies on international development. Fluent in French, English, and Chinese, Gosset lectured at Johns Hopkins University in Washington D.C., for the French institution Ecole Nationale d’Administration (ENA).

== Research ==
As a sinologist David Gosset writes on the Chinese world's economic, socio-political, cultural, strategic transformation, its impact on 21st-century Asia and the global village.

He studies the notion of the "Chinese Renaissance". In his approach of China (中国 - ZHONG GUO) he insists on the importance of the notion of centrality 中-(ZHONG): "Zhong -- 中, or centrality -- is one of the most ancient and common Chinese characters and, in an analogy which sheds a light on China's global modus operandi, its polysemy in the Chinese historical and cultural context mirrors three important measures of centrality in the field of graph theory".

What he calls the "Xi Jinping Decade" is an important moment of the "Chinese Renaissance". The Chinese dream, a key element of the Xi Jinping Decade, is approached by Gosset in the following terms: "Concept and project, definition and positioning of a nation in a century of change, Xi Jinping's China Dream can be presented as a triptych, the visions of "Modern China," "Global China" and "Civilizational China."

== Honors ==
David Gosset was awarded the "Cross of the Civil Order" in 2005 by the King of Spain, Juan Carlos I, for his work with the Academia Sinica Europaea

By a presidential decree on Dec 31 2014 he was nominated Knight of the Legion of Honor (Chevalier de la Légion d'honneur).

In September 2015 he received the Friendship Award from the Tianjin Municipality.

In June 2021, following the proposition of the President of the Council of Ministers of the Italian Republic, the Italian President Sergio Mattarella conferred to David Gosset the honor of Knight in the Order of Merit of the Italian Republic - Cavaliere Ordine al Merito della Republicca Italiana.

== Publications ==
- Limited Views on The Chinese Renaissance (《中华复兴管窥》), Shanghai Translation Publishing House, September 2018
- China and the World: The Long March Towards a Community of Shared Future for Mankind, edited by David Gosset, il Mulino Publishing House, 2020
- 《灵感·天津》（Inspiring Tianjin）（Tianjin en perspective(s)）, Tianjin Renmin Press, November 2020
- China and the World: The Long March Towards a Community of Shared Future for Mankind, Volume 2 The Role of Business, Società editrice il Mulino, 2021
- China and the World: The Long March Towards a Community of Shared Future for Mankind, Volume 3 Culture, Ideas and Arts, Società editrice il Mulino, December 2022
- 《灵感·山西》（Inspiring Shanxi）（Shanxi en perspective(s)）, New Star Press, Shanxi Education Press, 2023
- 《灵感·上海》（Inspiring Shanghai）（Shanghai en perspective(s)）, Shanghai People's Publishing House, 2024
