= Liu Mingfu =

Chinese retired army officer and commentator

Colonel (ret.) Liu Mingfu (刘明福) is a retired Chinese PLA officer and noted Chinese author, public speaker, and hawkish military commentator. As the author of well-known nationalist book China Dream: The Great Power Thinking and Strategic Positioning of China in the Post-American Era, Liu argues that China should displace the United States as world leader.

Liu advocates that China's pursuing a "military rise" will allow it to rival and then surpass America's role as a source of global order, in an Olympic-style competition between civilizations. Liu has taken inspiration from Union tactics in the American Civil War in a potential war of unification with Taiwan.

Along with co-author Wang Zhongyuan, Liu's book Xi Jinping sixiang (literally, Xi Jinping Thought) was the first public usage of that formulation.

== China Dream ==
Liu is most well known for his book China Dream, and also for the thoughts associated with it. The work does not predict inevitable conflict with the United States, but advocates China deterring the U.S.: "China's military rise is not to attack America, but to make sure that China is not attacked by America," Liu says. Liu's 2010 use of the China Dream in the context of advocating for a strong military was an early use of that phrase.

China must thus pursue a "military rise with Chinese characteristics that is defensive, peaceful, limited, necessary, important and urgent." William A. Callahan, a professor at the London School of Economics, says "rather than the win-win solutions suggested by both, The China Dream sees [international relations] as a zero-sum game where victory and defeat are total."

Liu's book and thinking on China's power is part of a large debate in the country, centered on the question of what a China-led world order would look like. Some high-profile military personnel in China, including Major General Luo Yuan, have raised questions about Liu Mingfu's analysis—pointing out, for example, the vast gulf between the current state of China's armed forces, and the state they would need to reach in Liu's vision of a China-led global order.

Western observers have described the book as a challenge to the United States role as a dominant power. In an apparent effort to diffuse American concerns about China as a challenger, Liu told ABC News, "there is no need for the American public to be afraid of China," adding that it's "impossible and unnecessary for China's military to surpass the United States."

Observers noted that the foreword to the book was penned by Lieutenant General Liu Yazhou, son-in-law of former top Party official Li Xiannian. This "suggests that at least one politically connected senior officer is willing to associate himself with the author’s views," and the book's advertising in China heavily played up this official imprimatur.

== Chinese exceptionalism ==
Liu has advocated for China to "be ready to become the world's helmsman," in part because "China possesses a superior cultural gene needed to become the world's leader."

== Published books ==
Liu has published 13 works, and there are 212 library holdings.

1. The China dream : great power thinking & strategic posture in the post-American era

2 editions published in 2015 in English and held by 106 WorldCat member libraries worldwide, including Harvard University Library, Princeton University Library, Pentagon Library, Yale University Library, etc.

The book examines the inherent conflict in U.S.- China relations and the coming "duel of the century" for economic, military, and cultural dominance in the world. Written by a veteran Chinese military specialist and scholar, The China Dream defines a national strategy to restore China to its historical glory and take the United States' place as world leader. First published in Beijing in 2010, The China Dream provoked international debate with its controversial vision of a world led by China. Now available in English, this is the definitive book for understanding the "hawk" version of China's national destiny debate and is essential for understanding China's strategic goals in the 21st century

2. Zhongguo meng : Zhong Mei shi ji dui jue, jun ren yao fa yan

2 editions published in 2010 in Chinese and held by 30 WorldCat member libraries worldwide, including Library of Congress, Princeton University East Asian Library, Stanford University Library, Nanyang Technological University, Taiwan National Central Library, University of Hong Kong, etc.

3. Zhongguo meng : hou Meiguo shi dai de da guo si wei yu zhan lüe ding wei

3 editions published between 2009 and 2010 in Chinese and held by 25 WorldCat member libraries worldwide, including Harvard-Yenching Library, Library of Congress, Cornell University Library, Shanghai Library, National Library of Australia, National Library Board, Singapore, University of Auckland, General Library, etc.

4. Zhongguo hun lian wei ji : xing guo bi xian xing jia

1 edition published in 2011 in Chinese and held by 23 WorldCat member libraries worldwide, including Columbia University in the City of New York, University of Pennsylvania Libraries, University of Toronto East Asian Library, etc.

5. Zhong Mei shi ji da dui jue

2 editions published in 2015 in Chinese and held by 7 WorldCat member libraries worldwide, including UC Berkeley Libraries, University of Pennsylvania Libraries, Library of Congress, Chicago Public Library, etc.

6. 80 hou jie guan Zhongguo : Zhongguo 80 hou xuan yan

1 edition published in 2012 in Chinese and held by 7 WorldCat member libraries worldwide, including Library of Congress, Northwestern University, National Library of Australia, etc.

7. Ting dang zhi hui : jian chi dang dui jun dui de jue dui ling dao

1 edition published in 2007 in Chinese and held by Library of Congress, University of Auckland, General Library and Hangzhou Library.

8. Jian chi yi fa cong yan zhi jun

1 edition published in 2010 in Chinese and held by Library of Congress, Cataloging Directorate and Hangzhou Library.

9. Fu guo qiang jun

1 edition published in 2007 in Chinese and held by Library of Congress, Keio University Libraries and Hangzhou Library.

10. Yong he xin jia zhi guan jian jun yu ren

1 edition published in 2009 in Chinese and held by Library of Congress.

11. Gao ju qi zhi : Zhongguo te se she hui zhu yi zai jue qi

1 edition published in 2008 in Chinese and held by Library of Congress, University of Auckland, General Library and Hangzhou Library.

12. Zhongguo meng : Zhongguo de mu biao, dao lu ji zi xin li

1 edition published in 2010 in Chinese and held by George Washington University and Hangzhou Library.

13. Jun dui xue xi shi jian ke xue fa zhan guan shi san jiang

1 edition published in 2008 in Chinese and held by Library of Congress.
