= James Fallows =

American writer and journalist (born 1949)

Jim Fallows
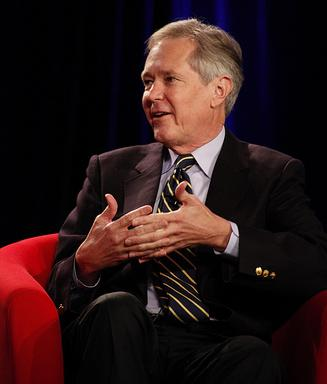
- Fallows in 2010

White House Director of Speechwriting
- In office January 20, 1977 – November 24, 1978
- President: Jimmy Carter
- Preceded by: Robert T. Hartmann
- Succeeded by: Bernard W. Aronson

Personal details
- Born: James Mackenzie Fallows; August 2, 1949 (age 77) Philadelphia, Pennsylvania, U.S.
- Party: Democratic
- Spouse: Deborah Fallows
- Children: 2
- Education: Harvard University (BA); Queen's College, Oxford (attended)

James Mackenzie Fallows (born August 2, 1949) is an American writer and journalist. He is a former national correspondent for The Atlantic. His work has also appeared in Slate, The New York Times Magazine, The New York Review of Books, The New Yorker and The American Prospect, among others. He is a former editor of U.S. News & World Report, and as President Jimmy Carter's chief speechwriter for two years was the youngest person ever to hold that job.

Fallows has been a visiting professor at a number of universities in the U.S. and China, and has held the Chair in U.S. Media at the United States Studies Centre at University of Sydney. He is the author of eleven books, including National Defense (1981), for which he received the 1983 National Book Award, Looking at the Sun (1994), Breaking the News (1996), Blind into Baghdad (2006), Postcards from Tomorrow Square (2009), China Airborne (2012), and the national best-seller Our Towns (2018), which was co-written with his wife, Deborah Fallows, and made into an HBO documentary of the same name in 2021.

== Early life and education ==
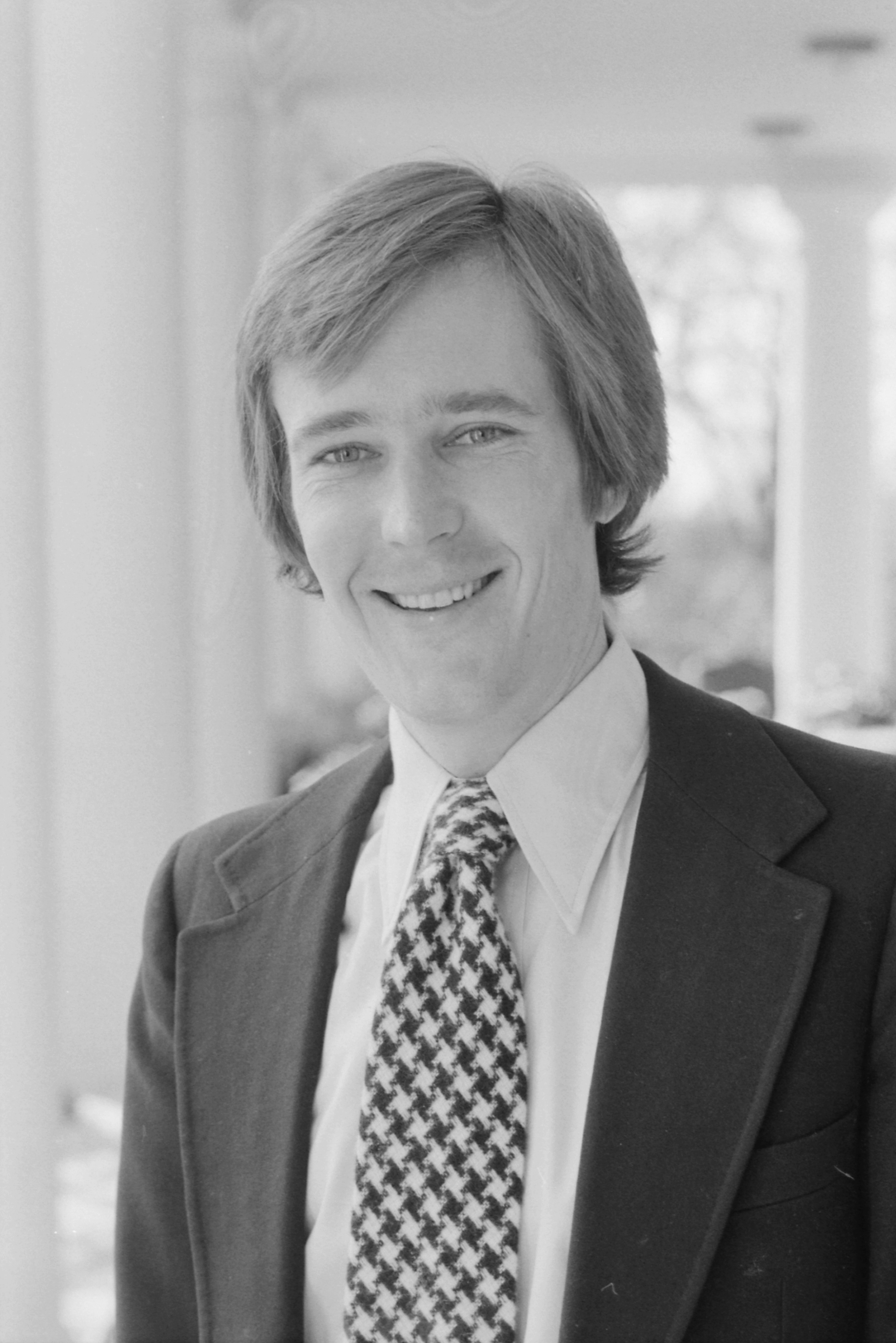
Fallows' 1977 White House staff photo

Fallows was born in Philadelphia, Pennsylvania, the son of Jean (née Mackenzie) and James Albert Fallows, a physician. He was raised in Redlands, California, and graduated from Redlands High School. He studied American history and literature at Harvard College, where he was the president of The Harvard Crimson. From 1970 to 1972, Fallows studied economics at The Queen's College, Oxford, as a Rhodes scholar. He subsequently worked as an editor and writer for The Washington Monthly and Texas Monthly magazines.

== Career ==
For the first two years of the Carter administration he was Carter's chief speechwriter. At age 27, he became the youngest person in history to hold that position. From 1979 through 1996, he was the Washington Editor for The Atlantic Monthly (now The Atlantic). For two years of that time he was based in Texas, and for four years in Asia. He wrote for the magazine about immigration, defense policy, politics, economics, computer technology, and other subjects. He has been a finalist for the National Magazine Awards five times and won in 2003, for "The Fifty-First State?" (The Atlantic, November 2002), which was published six months before the invasion of Iraq and laid out the difficulties of occupying the country. He won the National Book Award for National Defense and won a NY Emmy in 2010 for his role as host of a documentary series, Doing Business in China.

Fallows's most influential articles have concerned military policy and military procurement, the college admissions process, technology, China and Japan, and the American war in Iraq. Early in his career, he wrote an article called "What Did You Do in the Class War, Daddy?" (Washington Monthly, October 1975). It described the "draft physical" day at the Boston Navy Yard in 1970, in which Fallows and his Harvard and MIT classmates overwhelmingly produced reasons for medical exemptions, while the white working-class men of Chelsea, Massachusetts were approved for service. He argued that the class bias of the Vietnam draft, which made it easy for him and for others from influential and affluent families to avoid service, prolonged the war and that this was a truth many opponents of the war found convenient to overlook.

In the 1980s and 1990s Fallows was a frequent contributor of commentaries to National Public Radio's Morning Edition, and since 2009 he has been the regular news analyst for NPR's Weekend All Things Considered. From 1996 to 1998, he was the editor of US News & World Report. He was the founding chairman of the New America Foundation, a nonprofit group based in Washington D.C. During the 2000–2001 academic year, Fallows taught at the graduate school of journalism at the University of California, Berkeley, and in 2010 he was the Vare Writer in Residence at the University of Chicago. Starting in the 2010 academic year, he is a visiting Professor in U.S. Media at the United States Studies Centre at the University of Sydney.

Fallows is an instrument-rated pilot. In Free Flight, published in 2001, he described the new generation of "personal jets" and other advanced aircraft coming onto the market from Eclipse Aviation and Cirrus Design, as well as the story of Cirrus founders brothers Alan and Dale Klapmeier and how they became involved in aviation.

Fallows has had a long interest in technology, both writing about and helping to develop it. He's taken a special interest in personal information management software, going back to Lotus Agenda which he glowingly reviewed for The Atlantic in 1992 ("Of all the computer programs I have tried, Agenda is far and away the most interesting, and is one of the two or three most valuable"). During the operating system wars of the early and mid-nineties, Fallows used and wrote about IBM's Operating System/2 (OS/2) and its battles with MS Windows, often frequenting the Canopus forum and online community on CompuServe. In 1999, he spent six months at Microsoft designing software for writers. More recently, he has written about the design of the Open Source Applications Foundation's information manager, code-named Chandler. He was the on-stage host for the IDG Corporation's "Agenda" conference (no relation to Agenda software) in the early years of the 2000s (decade) and of Google's "Zeitgeist" conference starting in 2005. He has written regular technology columns for The New York Times and The Atlantic.

In September 2021, Fallows launched a Substack site called Breaking the News, whose title was based on his 1996 book of the same name. The column is read by senior editors and journalism professors. He urges newsrooms to pivot from asking how stories will play to "how will this work?" His focus is on broader industry discussions on how to cover polarized modern politics without misinforming the public.

== Politics ==
Fallows, a former speechwriter for Democratic President Jimmy Carter, has identified himself as a Democrat and has been described by Politico and The Hill, among other publications, as a liberal. According to journalist Howard Fineman, Fallows also wrote policy memos to Democratic President Bill Clinton. An article in The Futurist, a publication of the World Future Society, identifies Fallows as a radical centrist.

== Awards ==
For the first paperback edition of National Defense, Fallows received a 1983 National Book Award for Nonfiction. (Note: This was the award for paperback "General Nonfiction". From 1980 to 1983 in National Book Awards history there were several nonfiction subcategories including General Nonfiction, with dual hardcover and paperback awards in most categories. Most of the paperback award-winners were reprints, including this one.) He was a finalist at the National Magazine Award in the years 1988, 2006 (twice), 2007 and had won the award in 2003 for his article The Fifty-First State?. The documentary series On The Frontlines: Doing Business in China in which he participated as an editorial supervisor and co-host (together with Emily Chang) was awarded the 2010 Emmy Award.

He was elected to the American Academy of Arts and Sciences in 2019.

Fallows has received numerous honorary degrees, including from the University of Utah, the University of Maryland, the University of Redlands, Northwestern University, Ursinus College, and in 2017 the University of Vermont.

== Personal life ==
Fallows is married to writer and researcher Deborah Fallows, with whom he has two sons. The book Our Towns (2018) was co-authored and researched by the couple, which became the basis for an HBO documentary film in 2021.

In 2012, Fallows gained notice for the results of the testing of his genetic makeup. In addition to the fact that the lineage shown on the mitochondrial DNA of his mother's side did not resemble any other samples found in a large-scale study, it was shown that Fallows had an abnormally high percentage of Neanderthal ancestry, at 5% of his genes being of Neanderthal origin. This drew attention from numerous scientists.

== Publications ==
=== Books ===
External videos
- Booknotes interview with Fallows on More Like Us, April 6, 1989, C-SPAN
- Presentation by Fallows on Free Flight, July 12, 2001, C-SPAN
- Presentation by Fallows on China Airborne, May 16, 2012, C-SPAN
- Washington Journal interview with James and Deborah Fallows on Our Towns, May 25, 2018, C-SPAN

- Fallows, James (1971). The water lords: Ralph Nader's study group report on industry and environmental crisis in Savannah, Georgia. Grossman Publishers.
- Green, Mark; Fallows, James; Zwick, David (1972). Who runs Congress?. New York: Bantam Books.
- National Defense (1981). Random House. ISBN 0-394-51824-1
  - Fallows, James (June 1981). "M-16: A Bureaucratic Horror Story: Why the rifles jammed". The Atlantic. One of three excerpts from National Defense published in The Atlantic.
- More Like Us: Making America Great Again (1989). Houghton Mifflin. ISBN 0-395-49857-0
- Looking at the Sun: The Rise of the New East Asian Economic and Political System (1994). Vintage Paperback (reprint ed., 1995) ISBN 0-679-76162-4
- Breaking the News: How the Media Undermine American Democracy (1996). Pantheon Books. ISBN 0-679-44209-X. Vintage Paperback (1997) ISBN 0-679-75856-9
- Free Flight: Inventing the Future of Travel (2001). PublicAffairs Paperback (2002) ISBN 1-58648-140-1
- Blind into Baghdad: America's War in Iraq (2006). Vintage. ISBN 978-0-307-27796-1
- Postcards from Tomorrow Square: Reports from China (2009) Knopf. ISBN 978-0-307-47262-5
- China Airborne (2012) Random House. ISBN 978-0-375-42211-9
- Fallows, James; Fallows, Deborah (2018). Our Towns: A 100,000-Mile Journey into the Heart of America. Pantheon Books.

=== Essays and reporting ===
External videos
- Washington Journal interview with Fallows on his article "The Tragedy of the American Military", January 7, 2015, C-SPAN

- — (May 1979). "The Passionless Presidency: The trouble with Jimmy Carter's Administration". The Atlantic.
- — (September 1992). "Put Down That Bloody Shirt, Mr. President". The Washington Post.
- — (February 1996). "Why Americans Hate the Media". The Atlantic Monthly.
- — (August 1996). "Throwing like a girl". Sport. The Atlantic Monthly. 278 (2): 84–87.
- — (June 2009). "Inexact opposite: a hotel in Beijing shows off China's ability to (almost) get it right". The Atlantic. 303 (5): 28–29.
- — (August 2011). "In poll position". American Review. Archived from the original on January 21, 2012.
- — (December 2012). "My fellow Americans ..." Spotlight. Vanity Fair. 628: 134.
- — (June 2013). "The art of paying attention [interview with Linda Stone]". Dispatches. Tech. The Atlantic. 311 (5): 22, 24.
- — (June 2013). "The Fixer". The Atlantic. 311 (5): 46–55.
- — (January 2015). "The Tragedy of the American Military". The Atlantic.
- — (March 2016). "How America Is Putting Itself Back Together". The Atlantic.
- — (May 2018). "The Reinvention of America". The Atlantic.
