= Andy Hertzfeld =

American programmer (born 1953)

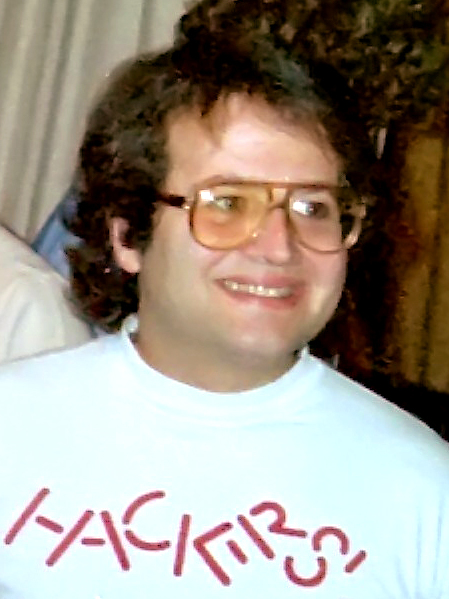
- Hertzfeld in 1985
- Born: Andrew Jay Hertzfeld; April 6, 1953 (age 73); Philadelphia, Pennsylvania, U.S.
- Education: Brown University (BS); University of California, Berkeley
- Occupation: Software engineer
- Known for: co-creation of original Macintosh computer
- Spouse: Joyce McClure (m. 1998)

Andrew Jay Hertzfeld (born April 6, 1953) is an American software engineer who was a member of Apple Computer's original Macintosh development team during the 1980s. After buying an Apple II in January 1978, he went to work for Apple Computer from August 1979 until March 1984, where he was a designer for the Macintosh system software.

Since leaving Apple, Hertzfeld has co-founded three companies: Radius in 1986, General Magic in 1990, and Eazel in 1999. In 2002, he helped Mitch Kapor promote open-source software with the Open Source Applications Foundation.

Hertzfeld worked at Google from 2005 to 2013, where, in 2011, he was the key designer of the Circles user interface in Google+.

== Career ==
=== Apple Computer (1979–1984) ===
After graduating from Brown University with a computer science degree in 1975, Hertzfeld attended graduate school at the University of California, Berkeley. In 1978, he bought an Apple II computer and soon began developing software for it. He went on to write for Call-A.P.P.L.E. and Dr. Dobb's Journal and soon came to the attention of Apple Computer.

He was hired by Apple Computer as a systems programmer in 1979 and developed the Apple Silentype printer firmware and wrote the firmware for the Sup'R'Terminal, the first 80-column card for the Apple II. In the early 1980s, he invited his high school friend, artist Susan Kare, to join Apple in order to help design what would become standard Macintosh icons.

With the first Macintosh, Hertzfeld wrote an icon editor and font editor so that Susan Kare could design the symbols used in the operating system.

Hertzfeld was a member of the design team for the Apple Macintosh, which was conceived by human–computer interface expert Jef Raskin. After a shakeup in the Apple II team and Apple co-founder Steve Wozniak's brief departure from the company due to a plane crash, co-founder Steve Jobs took control of the nearly two-year-old Macintosh team in February 1981 and added Hertzfeld to it at his request. Working for Bud Tribble alongside Bill Atkinson and Burrell Smith, Hertzfeld became a primary software architect of the Macintosh Operating System, which was considered revolutionary in its use of the graphical user interface (GUI) where Raskin also made contributions.

Hertzfeld's business card at Apple listed his title as Software Wizard. He wrote large portions of the Macintosh's original system software, including much of the ROM code, the User Interface Toolbox, and a number of innovative components now standard in many graphic user interfaces, like the Control Panel and Scrapbook.

Hertzfeld's assessment of company culture at Apple and his ideas about programming are described in the book Programmers at Work, a collection of interviews published by Microsoft Press in 1986.

=== After Apple (1984–present) ===
After leaving Apple in 1984, Hertzfeld co-founded three new companies: Radius (1986), General Magic (1990), and Eazel (1999). At Eazel, he helped to create the Nautilus file manager for Linux's GNOME desktop. He volunteered for the Open Source Applications Foundation in 2002 and 2003, writing early prototypes of Chandler, their information manager. In 1996, Hertzfeld was interviewed by Robert X. Cringely on the television documentary Triumph of the Nerds, and was again interviewed by Cringely on NerdTV in 2005.

In early 2004, he started folklore.org, a Web site devoted to collective storytelling that contains dozens of anecdotes about the development of the original Macintosh. The stories have been collected in an O'Reilly book, Revolution in the Valley, published in December 2004.

In August 2005, Hertzfeld joined Google. On June 28, 2011, Google announced Google+, its latest attempt at social networking. Hertzfeld was the key designer of the Google+ Circles interface. He also worked on Picasa, and Gmail's profile image selector. He retired from Google in July 2013.

As of October 2018, he is an investor of the startup Spatial.

== In media ==
Hertzfeld was portrayed by Elden Henson in the 2013 film Jobs. He was later played by actor Michael Stuhlbarg in the 2015 film Steve Jobs. Hertzfeld stated "almost nothing in it is how it really happened" about the Steve Jobs film, and that the film ultimately was not aiming for realism.

== Personal life ==
Hertzfeld attended Harriton High School. He and his wife live in Palo Alto, California.
