= Revolution in the Valley =

2004 book by Andy Hertzfeld

Revolution in the Valley: The Insanely Great Story of How the Mac Was Made
- The cover page of the paperback in 2004
- Author: Andy Hertzfeld
- Language: English
- Genre: Business, Apple
- Publisher: O'Reilly Media
- Publication date: December 2004
- Publication place: United States
- Media type: E-book, print (hardback and paperback)
- Pages: 320 pp
- ISBN: 978-1449316242

Revolution in the Valley: The Insanely Great Story of How the Mac Was Made is a nonfiction book written by Andy Hertzfeld about the birth of the Apple Macintosh personal computer. The author was a core member of the team that built the Macintosh system software and the chief creator of the Mac's radical new user interface software. The book is a collection of anecdotes tracing the development of the Macintosh from a secret project in 1979 through its "triumphant introduction" in 1984. These anecdotes were originally published on the author's Folklore.org web site.

== Content ==
The book focuses on the hardware design and software development by the original Macintosh team at Apple Computer, including sometimes technical details of ports and cards and code. It describes the Mac's introduction by Steve Jobs, and improvements made shortly thereafter. Steve Wozniak wrote the foreword.

The author reveals that both Steve Jobs and Bill Gates had first seen the innovative Graphic User Interface at the offices of Xerox's Palo Alto Research Center (PARC), which had prototyped the "desktop computer" concept by 1978.
