= Deborah Fallows =

American writer and linguist

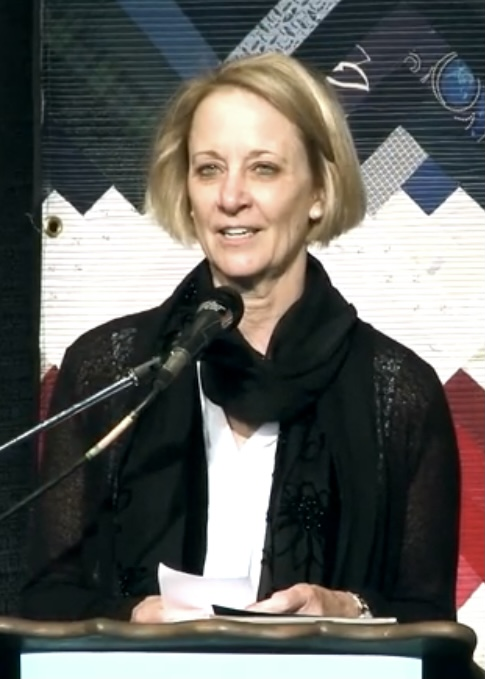
- Fallows in 2016
- Education: Harvard University (AB); University of Texas (PhD)
- Occupations: Writer, linguist
- Spouse: James Fallows
- Children: 2

Deborah Fallows is an American writer and linguist. She is a fellow at the New America Foundation, and was assistant dean in languages and linguistics at Georgetown University.

== Early life and education ==
Fallows grew up in both Minneapolis, Minnesota and Vermilion, Ohio.

She graduated with a B.A. from Harvard University and received a Ph.D. in theoretical linguistics from the University of Texas.

== Career ==
Fallows was the assistant dean of languages and linguistics at Georgetown University. She chose to be a stay at home mother after the birth of her second son. Fallows wrote of her experiences in her first book, A Mother's Work (1985).

From 2012 to 2017, Fallows and her husband, James Fallows, flew their single-engine plane across America to visit small towns, which was the basis of their latest book, Our Towns (2018). The book was made into an HBO documentary film in 2021.

Fallows and her husband started the Our Towns Civic Foundation in 2021.

== Personal life ==
With James Fallows she has two sons and six grandchildren.

== Selected works ==
- Fallows, Deborah (1985). A Mother's Work. Houghton Mifflin Harcourt. ISBN 978-0-395-36218-1.
- Fallows, Deborah (2010). Dreaming in Chinese: Mandarin Lessons In Life, Love, And Language. Bloomsbury USA. ISBN 978-0-8027-7913-7.
- Fallows, James M.; Fallows, Deborah (2018). Our Towns: A 100,000-mile Journey Into the Heart of America. Pantheon Books. ISBN 978-1-101-87184-3.
