= American Review (political magazine) =

American Review (Global Perspectives on US Affairs) was an online political magazine published twice a year by the United States Studies Centre at the University of Sydney in Australia. The magazine was established in 2006. As the magazine was based outside America, the emphasis was on a "fair and balanced" interpretation of American affairs with some focus on the US relationship with Australia and the Pacific region.

It ceased publishing new material in 2015.
