= Bud Tribble =

American computer scientist

Guy L. "Bud" Tribble is a software technologist known for his work on the original Apple Macintosh.

== Work ==
Tribble was a member of the original Apple Macintosh design team. He served as manager of the software development team, and helped to design the classic Mac OS and its user interface. He was among the founders of NeXT, Inc., serving as NeXT's vice president of software development. Tribble is one of the industry's top experts in software design and object-oriented programming.

Tribble's career includes time at Sun Microsystems and Eazel. At Eazel, he was vice president of Engineering leading development of next generation user interface software and Internet services for Linux computers. Tribble was also chief technology officer for the Sun-Netscape Alliance, responsible for guiding Internet and e-commerce software R&D. Tribble earned a BA degree in physics at the University of California, San Diego, and an MD and PhD in biophysics and physiology at the University of Washington in Seattle.

As of 2016, Tribble is one of three "policy czars" at Apple (along with Jane Horvath and Erik Neuenschwander) who spends a significant amount of time on privacy. Any collection of Apple customer data requires sign-off from a committee of the three privacy czars and a top executive, according to four former employees of Apple who worked on a variety of products that went through privacy vetting.

== See also ==
- Outline of Apple Inc. (personnel)
- History of Apple Inc.
