= Open Source Applications Foundation =

Former open-source organization

- Type: 501(c)(6) organization
- Region served: Worldwide
- Method: Promotion, protection, and standardization of Linux by providing unified resources and services needed for open source to successfully compete with closed platforms.
- Website: www.osafoundation.org

The Open Source Applications Foundation (OSAF) was a non-profit organization that was established in 2001 with the goal of developing open-source software applications and tools. The organization's most notable project was Chandler, a Personal information management software and collaborative productivity suite.

== History ==
OSAF was founded in 2001 by software pioneer Mitch Kapor in an effort to rearrange the dynamics of the software community. In an interview with CNET a few years after the foundation was established, Kapur described the allure of open-source software: "I think that for people who use software, in the long run, open-source products are going to be less expensive and of higher quality. Also, open-source products put more control into the hands of people and organizations that use the software, which is a good thing."

Funding for OSAF was primarily provided by Kapor himself, although the foundation did also receive sizable grants from the Andrew W. Mellon Foundation and the Common Solutions Group to develop the much-anticipated Chandler project.

In January 2008, Kapor ended his involvement with the foundation, stepped down from the board, and provided transitional funding. In the restructure that followed, Katie Capps Parlante became acting president. There were at one time eleven employees with Sheila Mooney as president.

== OSAF Mission ==
The OSAF was guided by a list of 7 principles that would make up the organization's mission:

1. Create and gain wide adoption of open source application software of uncompromising quality.
2. Carry forward the vision of Vannevar Bush, Doug Engelbart, and Ted Nelson of the computer as a medium for communication, collaboration, and coordination.
3. Design a new application to manage personal information including notes, mail, tasks, appointments and events, contacts, documents and other personal resources.
4. Enable sharing with colleagues, friends and family. In particular, meet the unique and under-served needs of small group collaboration.
5. Demonstrate that open source software *can* serve a general audience in the consumer market.
6. Offer a choice of platforms and full interoperability amongst Microsoft Windows, MacOS, and Linux versions.
7. Leverage our resources by using an open source model of development.

== Chandler Project ==
Chandler was a personal information management software aimed at integrating emails, calendars, tasks, and notes into one single application.The project was expected by some members of the open-source community to be an open source alternative to Microsoft Outlook. Chandler was recommended because it draws inspiration from productivity experts, features dashboards to structure information and because it should be free to use.

The development of Chandler faced numerous challenges, including technical complexities, feature creep, and management issues. The project's ambitious goals and the complexity of implementing them led to delays and a protracted development cycle. Despite the efforts of the OSAF team and the enthusiasm of the community, Chandler failed to deliver a stable and fully-featured product.

The 2007 book "Dreaming in Code: Two Dozen Programmers, Three Years, 4,732 Bugs, and One Quest for Transcendent Software" documented the struggles of OSAF in building an open-source calendar application, Chandler.
