= Chandler (software) =

Personal information management software

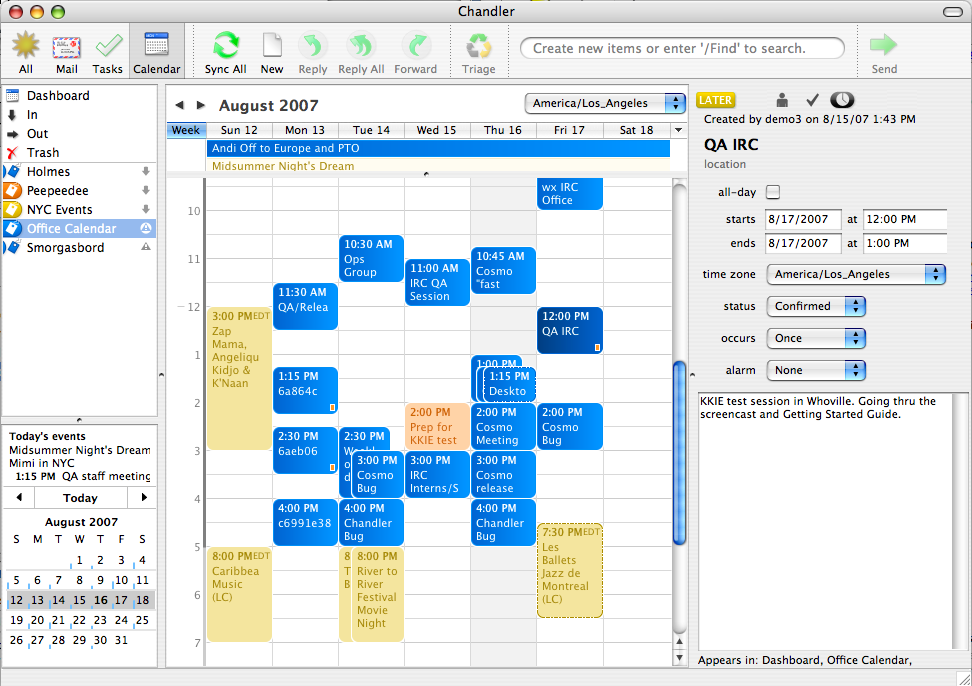
- Chandler calendar
- Developer: Open Source Applications Foundation
- Final release: 1.0.3.1 / July 30, 2009; 17 years ago
- Written in: Python
- Operating system: Linux, Mac OS X, Microsoft Windows
- Type: Personal information manager
- License: Apache License 2.0
- Website: www.chandlerproject.org

Chandler is a discontinued personal information management software suite described by its developers as a "Note-to-Self Organizer" designed for personal and small-group task management and calendaring. It is free software, previously released under the GNU General Public License, and now released under the Apache License 2.0. It is inspired by a PIM from the 1980s called Lotus Agenda, notable because of its "free-form" approach to information management. Lead developer of Agenda, Mitch Kapor, was also involved in the vision and management of Chandler.

Chandler consists of a cross-platform desktop application (Windows, Mac OS X, Linux), the Chandler Hub Sharing Service, Chandler Server, Chandler Quick Entry for iPhone, and Chandler Quick Entry for Android. Version 1.0 of the software was released on August 8, 2008.

Chandler was developed by the Open Source Applications Foundation (OSAF). It is named after the mystery novelist Raymond Chandler.

== Chandler design goals ==
Chandler aimed to create a workflow for personal information management different from that in other PIMs. Its approach is mainly based in creating a unified representation for the storage of tasks and information so that they can be classified in a homogeneous way, refining that information through an iterative workflow, and allowing easy collaboration on the defined items. Other goals included:

- Build on open source software that supports open standards, choosing projects that are reliable, well documented, and widely used
- Use the Python language at the top level to orchestrate low level, higher performance code
- Design a platform that supports an extensible modular architecture
- For the desktop client, choose a cross-platform user interface toolkit that provides native user experience
- Use a persistent object database
- Build in security from the ground up
- Build an architecture that supports sharing, communication, and collaboration

== Reception ==
The first public releases of Chandler generated expectations to provide a flexible and general information management tool, because of its heritage of concepts from Agenda and usage of principles from the Getting Things Done management method. Early responses praised its open nature and its unified approach to management of different information types.

Despite this, the lack of a stable version and the small developer base diminished public interest in the project. In January 2008, Mitch Kapor announced that he was leaving the board and would only finance Chandler until the end of 2008. After that, OSAF released a 1.0 version. Jake Edge from LWN.net called this move a "last gasp attempt to build a community of users and developers to continue Chandler development down the road", speculating that the lack of developers was caused by the close control of the project by OSAF, and this end of its funding could attract attention again.

There have been no releases since 2009.

== In popular culture ==
Chandler is the subject of the non-fiction book Dreaming in Code: Two Dozen Programmers, Three Years, 4732 Bugs, and One Quest for Transcendent Software by Scott Rosenberg.

== See also ==
- List of personal information managers
- Internet Systems Consortium (ISC)
