= Amiga Sidecar =

Amiga add-on hardware

Amiga A1060 Sidecar
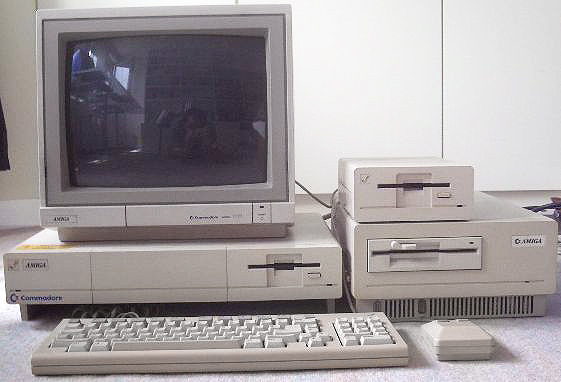
- Amiga 1000 with A1060 next to the right, and external A1010 floppy disk drive atop the Sidecar
- Also known as: Amiga Sidecar
- Developer: Commodore Germany
- Manufacturer: Commodore Int'l.
- Product family: A1000
- Type: Hardware-Emulator
- Released: 1986; 40 years ago
- Operating system: PC DOS/MS-DOS 2.0-3.20, CP/M-86
- CPU: Intel 8088 @ 4.77 MHz (Siemens SAB8088-P used) opt. 8087 FPU
- Memory: 256 KB – 640 KB
- Storage: built-in 360 KB 5.25" floppy-drive built-in 10–20 MB hard drive
- Graphics: MDA, CGA
- Input: Amiga Mouse, Keyboard
- Platform: x86
- Dimensions: W: 270 mm (11 in); H: 137 mm (5.4 in); D: 380 mm (15 in)
- Weight: 8.1 kg (18 lb)
- Backward compatibility: PC XT: 8-Bit ISA
- Related: CBM “Bridgeboards”

The Commodore A1060 Sidecar is an expansion hardware device developed by Commodore and released in 1986 for the Amiga 1000 computer. It sits beside the computer similar to a motorcycle's sidecar.

== Overview ==
The Sidecar-expansion for the A1000 is in essence a complete IBM Personal Computer XT-clone in itself with its own motherboard, yet in an expansion case, which connects to the expansion-bus on the right side of the Amiga 1000 computer (→ Side-expansion Port). It is built around the same Intel 8088 processor, the original IBM PC/XT (→ IBM 5160) was already build around, although Commodore shipped it mostly using German Siemens-CPUs or other CPU-variants from Asian vendors (likely due to lower costs). (Note: There seems to be none sold Sidecar-units having actually installed a Intel-8088 chip, as most units were equipped with genuine Siemens' SAB8088-P CPUs or other CPU-variants from NEC, Hitachi or others.) (Note: Today, many expansions may have gotten their CPUs replaced over time with the pin-compatible and socket-compatible in-place upgrade of a NEC V20-CPU, which (at the same clock-frequency) already was slightly faster and also could run significantly faster at 8 or 10 MHz with at the same time improved performance and reduced power-consumption, while later versions added clock-speeds of up to 12 and 16 MHz.)

The display of video and user-input are performed through the Amiga's monitor, keyboard and mouse respectively. This allows the user to control both computers simultaneously through the Amiga only. The Sidecar has no other means of connection.

It is to be noted that the Sidecar cannot be used with a stock-equipped Amiga 1000, as the A1000 needs to have at least 512 KB Chip-RAM for functioning with the Sidecar. A given A1000 thus needs to have Commodore's 256 KB A1050-expansion installed prior to using the Amiga A1060 Sidecar with it.

== Technical Background ==
The underlying Commodore-custom PC/XT-clone, whose peripheral control is solely and wholly handled through the Amiga 1000 alone, is complete in and of itself (with all other means of expansions like sound-, graphic-, harddisk-controller- and possibly other expansion-cards), yet the Sidecar offers no actual ability for any connection of input-devices to the PC itself like a keyboard or mouse – That is to be exclusively controlled by the Amiga-side of the whole system. Thus any input is exclusively to be made via the Amiga itself and the Sidecar cannot be used as a stand-alone IBM-PC on its own.

All I/O from the PC-side is performed by and through the Amiga itself, as the Sidecar itself has no I/O-ports other than the internal ISA-slots for IBM-compatible expansion-cards (of which Commodore offered a assortment of equipment to be sold for the Sidecar). Since other than both the Amiga Mouse- and Joystick-port (which are covered by the Sidecar's case once attached) being routed through to ports of the Sidecar at the front of the case itself, and a connector for Commodore's own proprietary 23-pin Floppy-port at the back of the case, the Sidecar has no other external connection-ports and lacks even a typical IBM-PC 5-pin DIN Keyboard-port (DIN 41524) for the PC-side.

Every interconnection between both sides is handled by a Commodore-specific daughter-board inside the Sidecar for all of the interconnection and all other resources, including the sharing of video-output over to the Amiga-side, via a shared-memory model Commodore calls Dual-Port RAM (sized 128 KB), which is to be accessed by both the Amiga and PC simultaneously – 8 kB for mono-display, 32 kB for display of colour-modes, 16 kB used for maintenance of records, 64 kB for given data exchange and 8 kB is used for I/O registers.

Amiga-Software as well as PC-programs were included to allow data to be exchanged easily between the PC- and the Amiga-side of the system, as well as copying displayed screen-content of the PC-side. Among else, it enabled even to simply copy the screen-content of the integrated PC-side per the Amiga-mouse (by simple selection), to be directly pasted into the Amiga's clipboard via the typical way of Copy'nPaste we know today, which was still revolutionary for the time of the Sidecar.

The Sidecar had an internal hard disk, which was accessible from both the DOS and AmigaOS environments at the same time, to be partitioned as PC- and Amiga harddisk simultaneously, where it was possible to partition one for the PC and others for the Amiga itself. Although the Amiga A1000 was not meant to boot from the harddisk, the PC actually indeed was. This was also the first hard-drive ever produced by Commodore for the Amiga itself.

== Equipment ==
Commodore offered several types of equipment for the A1060 itself to be used on the PC-side of the Sidecar.
Such as floppy-disk drives, hard-disk drives as well as Commodore's own various expansion-cards for the Sidecar's fully IBM-PC XT-compatible 8-Bit ISA-slots, whereas the ISA-cards seem to be derived from Commodore's own assortment of IBM-compatible PCs like their PC 10 (-III)- or PC 20 (-III) line.

The Sidecar could be also upgraded with more RAM and equipped with a given co-processor (8087 FPU) as well as various (Commodore-supplied) ISA-extension cards. Additionally, the A1060 Sidecar could also be equipped with a 512 KB/1 MB RAM-expansion card, which then expanded the memory-capacity of the Amiga itself with the given amount of RAM, with the Sidecar working essentially as a path-through for the Amiga's internal expansion-slot.

Official Commodore-equipment offered for the A1060 Sidecar
Name	Type	Specifications	Connection
Commodore A1010; Floppy Disk Drive (external)	FDD	3½″ 80-Track Floppy disk-drive for DS/DD-diskettes with a capacity of either 880 KByte (Amiga-formatted) or 720 KByte (DOS-formatted) It could be either attached to the Amiga itself or the Sidecar, whereas it read normal Amiga-formatted disks on the A1000 (880 KB), yet worked as a standard PC-drive when attached to the Sidecar itself (720 KB). The drive thus worked with the given platform-specific format accordingly, depending on where it was attached to. Note: The A1010 was Commodore's standard issue external floppy-drive being sold for the A1000.	Amiga Floppy-Port
Commodore A1020; Floppy Disk Drive (external)	FDD	5¼″ 40-Track Floppy disk-drive for Doubled-Sided DD-diskettes with a capacity of 360 KByte (DOS-formatted); The floppy-drive required an own supplied external power-supply. The supplied Amiga Extras Disk v1.2 contains tools to read DOS-formatted disks even under Amiga OS. Note: The A1020 cannot physically read anything else than the standard 360 KByte IBM-compatible DOS-formatted disks, even if attached to the Amiga itself.	Amiga Floppy-Port
Commodore Monochrom Video-card (internal)	Graphics-card	A Commodore-supplied MDA-standard based IBM-compatible graphics-card for monochrome video-modes.: MDA (Textmode: 80 × 25 Chars)	8-Bit ISA-Slot
Commodore Advanced Graphics Adapter (internal)	Graphics-card	A AGA-card called Commodore multimode IBM-compatible graphics-card for multiple multi-color video-modes, offering following Text-/Graphics-Modes; MDA (Textmode: 80 × 25 Chars); CGA (80×25 Chars Textmode, 160×100@16, 320×200@4 or 640×200@2 Graphics-Mode); EGA (80×43 Chars Textmode or 640×350@16 Graphics-Mode); HGC (80×25 Chars Textmode or 720×348 Graphics-Mode); Plantronics Colorplus Video-features (80×25 Chars Textmode, 320×200@16 or 640×200@4 Graphics-Mode).; The card additionally offered the Hercules-standard including Parallel-port for attachment of a printer. Note: The term AGA here is not to be confused with the way later follow-up of the ECS-chipset called AA/AGA.	8-Bit ISA-Slot
Commodore Parallel Interface-card (internal)	Interface-card	Also called a PC Printer Card, it offered a Parallel-port (LPT) for the PC-side to be used on a dedicated ISA-card.	8-Bit ISA-Slot
Commodore Serial Interface-card (internal)	Interface-card	Also called a PC Serial Printer Card, it offered a Serial-port (COM) for the PC-side to be used on a dedicated ISA-card.	8-Bit ISA-Slot
Commodore Hard Disk card (internal)	HDD-Controller	A dedicated Harddisk-controller ISA-card Commodore offered with their respective 10- & 20 MByte Harddisk-options for the PC-side. The hard-disk could be either wholly used for the PC-side, or partitioned to be used for the DOS-environment and the Amiga A1000 as a hard-disk for respective file-storage concurrently and at the same time. However, only the PC/XT could actually boot from it, while the A1000 had to be still booted using its Kickstart-disk.	8-Bit ISA-Slot

== Market ==
The Sidecar was developed by Commodore Germany, as was all of the Commodore PC-architecture based development. It was relatively expensive and it required a non-trivial amount of desktop space compared to the Amiga 1000 by itself. The device was also taller than the Amiga 1000, which made it seem even more aesthetically disconnected from the main system.

The Sidecar could also not be used with a stock A1000, as it had to have at least 512 KB of Chip-RAM for working with the Sidecar in the first place.
Thus the A1000 needed to first have the A1050-expansion installed beforehand, increasing the already high acquisition costs for the whole system even further. (Note: Amiga 1060 Sidecar User-Manual, p. 3)

Besides the high price and the aesthetic issues, other factors contributed to the Sidecar's lack of adoption. The Amiga 2000 provided internal expansion slots, allowing the optional Bridgeboard card to replace the functionality of the Sidecar without needing a bulky external chassis. The popular Amiga 500 could not be used with the Sidecar at all, due to the expansion slot on the A500 residing on the left side of the chassis, as opposed to the right side on the A1000. Also, decent business and productivity software began to be released for AmigaOS, reducing the need to run MS-DOS applications on the Amiga.

The Sidecar's concept of compatibility through hardware-expansions was continued in the later Amiga 2000 unit, containing four ISA slots intended for PC emulation expandability. Two slots were in-line with the Amiga Zorro II bus to allow installation of a Bridgeboard which, like the Sidecar, provided the core chipset of a PC on an expansion card, connected to both the Amiga and PC bus.

== History ==
Early in its life, the Amiga was strong in entertainment and graphics software but lacked general productivity software such as word processors, spreadsheets and database software. These are the areas where the de facto business standard IBM PC excelled. Commodore's intent was to let the Amiga take advantage of PC compatibility to shore up its weakness in this category of software.

== Reception ==
Bruce F. Webster wrote in the October 1985 issue of BYTE, after seeing the Amiga for the first time:

The 86-pin [expansion port] gives whatever is sitting out there complete control of the machine (if it wants control). The disk-controller hardware can already handle 5¼-inch drives ... the keyboard is sufficiently populated [to] support most MS-DOS programs, and the screen resolutions (320 by 200, etc.) are, by an amazing coincidence, identical to those for most IBM graphics cards. How hard would it be to build a box with the necessary CPU and ROMs that would turn the Amiga into an IBM-compatible machine? Not very hard, I would think—certainly not as hard as it has been for the folks at Dayna Communications to get MacCharlie, which attempts to get the Mac run MS-DOS software, up and running.

Webster, in September 1986, noted the Sidecar's announcement as fulfilling his prediction. Jerry Pournelle that month named the Sidecar his "number one pick of Spring COMDEX, stating that "it was eerie to watch Flight Simulator running as if on a PC and still see the famous Amiga bouncing ball in the background and a word-processing program running in the foreground".

== Technical specifications ==
The Amiga Sidecar is a complete IBM PC XT system, with the exception of I/O devices and operations (which are handled by the Amiga).

- Processor: Intel 8088 @ 4.77 MHz
- RAM: 256 kB (expandable to 512 kB) + 80 kB Dual Bus Memory
- Graphics Emulation: Dependent on Amiga settings (can use 8-bit ISA graphics cards)
- Sound Emulation: Dependent on Amiga settings (can use real 8-bit ISA sound cards)
- One internal 5.25" drive bay (normally fitted with a 360K 5.25" floppy drive)
- 3 x 8-bit ISA slots (for using PC expansion cards)
- Amiga 1000 Expansion Bus connector (for Amiga connectivity)
- Additional slot for an 8087 numeric coprocessor

== See also ==
- MacCharlie
