= MacTerminal =

Classic Mac OS terminal emulator

- Screenshot of MacTerminal 2.2
- Developers: Mike Boich & Martin Haeberli for Apple Computer
- Final release: 3.1
- Operating system: Classic Mac OS
- Type: Communications
- License: Proprietary

MacTerminal was the first telecommunications and terminal emulation application software program available for the Mac. MacTerminal enabled users to connect via modem or serial port to bulletin board systems and online services (e.g., The Source, CompuServe), and to other computers. MacTerminal was capable of emulating the DEC VT100 and other computer terminals.

Apple Computer began retailing MacTerminal in July 1984 following the launch of the Macintosh 128K in January. MacTerminal was compatible with the original 128K model using Apple's optional 300 or 1200 bit/s external modem designed for the Apple II, but MacTerminal was not available for general release at the 128K's launch date. Apple began bundling MacTerminal with later Macintosh models.

When Apple Computer, Inc. spawned Claris in 1987 as its application software division, Claris continued development of most of Apple's major applications, but development of MacTerminal ceased. However, similar functionality was rolled into ClarisWorks' terminal program.

== See also ==
- MacDraw
- MacPaint
- MacWrite
- Terminal (macOS)
