= EditDV =

Video editing software released by Radius, Inc.

- Other names: CineStream
- Original author: Radius, Inc.
- Developer: Media 100
- Initial release: 1997; 29 years ago
- Final release: 3.0 / 2002; 24 years ago
- Operating system: Mac OS, Microsoft Windows
- Type: Video editing software
- License: Proprietary

EditDV was a video editing software released by Radius, Inc. in late 1997 as an evolution of their earlier Radius Edit product. EditDV was one of the first products providing professional-quality editing of the then new DV format at a relatively affordable cost ($999 including Radius FireWire capture card) and was named "The Best Video Tool of 1998". Originally EditDV was available for Macintosh only but in February 2000 EditDV 2.0 for Windows was released. With version 3.0 EditDV's name was changed to CineStream.

== Features ==
Originally bundled with a FireWire card, EditDV 1.5 got updated into a less expensive software only package for use with the newer PowerMac G3 that came with a FireWire interface. Later, a scaled down version named EditDV 1.6.1 Unplugged was released as a freeware version next to EditDV 2.0.

Unlike many other applications at the time which transcoded video to M-JPEG for editing, EditDV provided lossless native editing of the DV format. Only transitions (such as dissolves or wipes), effects (such as rotating or scaling the video, adjusting the audio level, or adding titles) and filters (such as changing the brightness or color balance) needed to be rendered. This also had the disadvantage to not work with analogue video capture.

EditDV was built on top of QuickTime and supported QuickTime filters as well as its own built-in effects and transitions. Effects could be animated using keyframes. EditDV 2.0 worked natively with Quicktime MOV format. For Microsoft Windows users, where the standard was AVI, this required the use of a provided external conversion tool afterwards when AVI was wanted.

The user interface had a Project window for organising clips into bins, a Sequence window with a multi-track timeline for arranging clips into a program using three-point editing, and Source and Program monitor windows. A finished program could either be exported as a QuickTime movie or written back to DV tape using the "print to video" command.

Version 3.0, then renamed CineStream, shifted towards web designers who wanted to add video streaming interactivity to a website. The new feature called EventStream allowed setting clickable hot spots to link to another location, either to another page with a URL or to another video. This feature distinguished CineStream from the rest of the competition.

== Products ==
The EditDV product family included a number of related products, all sharing a similar name:

- EditDV Video editing software (Mac and Windows)
- SoftDV A QuickTime software codec for playing DV media, included as part of EditDV (Mac and Windows)
- MotoDV PCI-based FireWire interface with DV capture software (Mac and Windows)
- PhotoDV Software to capture high-quality stills from a DV tape using MotoDV hardware (Mac and Windows)
- RotoDV Software for rotoscoping (painting over video), released in Sept 1999 (Macintosh only)

== Name changes and eventual demise ==
In 1999, the company Radius Inc. changed its name to Digital Origin. In 2000, Digital Origin Inc (and EditDV) was bought by Media 100. In early 2001, Media 100 released an updated version of EditDV under the new name CineStream 3.0. Later that year (October 2001) Media 100 was bought by Autodesk's Discreet Division.

CineStream for Macintosh required classic Mac OS. It was never ported to Mac OS X and faced increasing competition on that platform from Apple's own Final Cut Pro application. Development of EditDV/Cinestream was officially discontinued in 2002.
