= Radius Inc. =

American computer hardware company (1986–2002)

- Type: Public
- Industry: Computer hardware
- Founded: California (16 May 1986)
- Defunct: 2002
- Fate: Acquired by Media 100
- Headquarters: Sunnyvale, California, United States
- Key people: Burrell Smith; Andy Hertzfeld; Mike Boich; Matt Carter; Alain Rossmann
- Products: Radius Accelerator, Radius Full-Page Display, Radius Two Page Display, Radius GS/C, Radius DirectColor, Radius QuickColor, Radius Pivot, PrecisionColor, Radius Thunder, RadiusTV, VideoVision, Radius Rocket
- Revenue: US$308 million (1995)
- Number of employees: 237
- Website: radius.com at the Wayback Machine (archived 1998-05-29)

Radius Inc. was an American computer hardware firm founded in May 1986 by Burrell Smith, Mike Boich, Matt Carter, Alain Rossmann and joined by other members of the original Macintosh team like Andy Hertzfeld. The company specialized in Macintosh peripherals and accessory equipment. It completed its IPO in June 1990.

Their products included processor upgrade cards (Radius Accelerator) bringing Motorola 68020 processors to earlier Macintosh systems; graphics accelerators (Radius QuickColor); television tuners (RadiusTV); video capture cards (VideoVision); color calibrators (PrecisionColor); multi-processor systems (Radius Rocket) for 3D rendering and multiple OS sessions; high-end video adapters and monitors.

== History ==
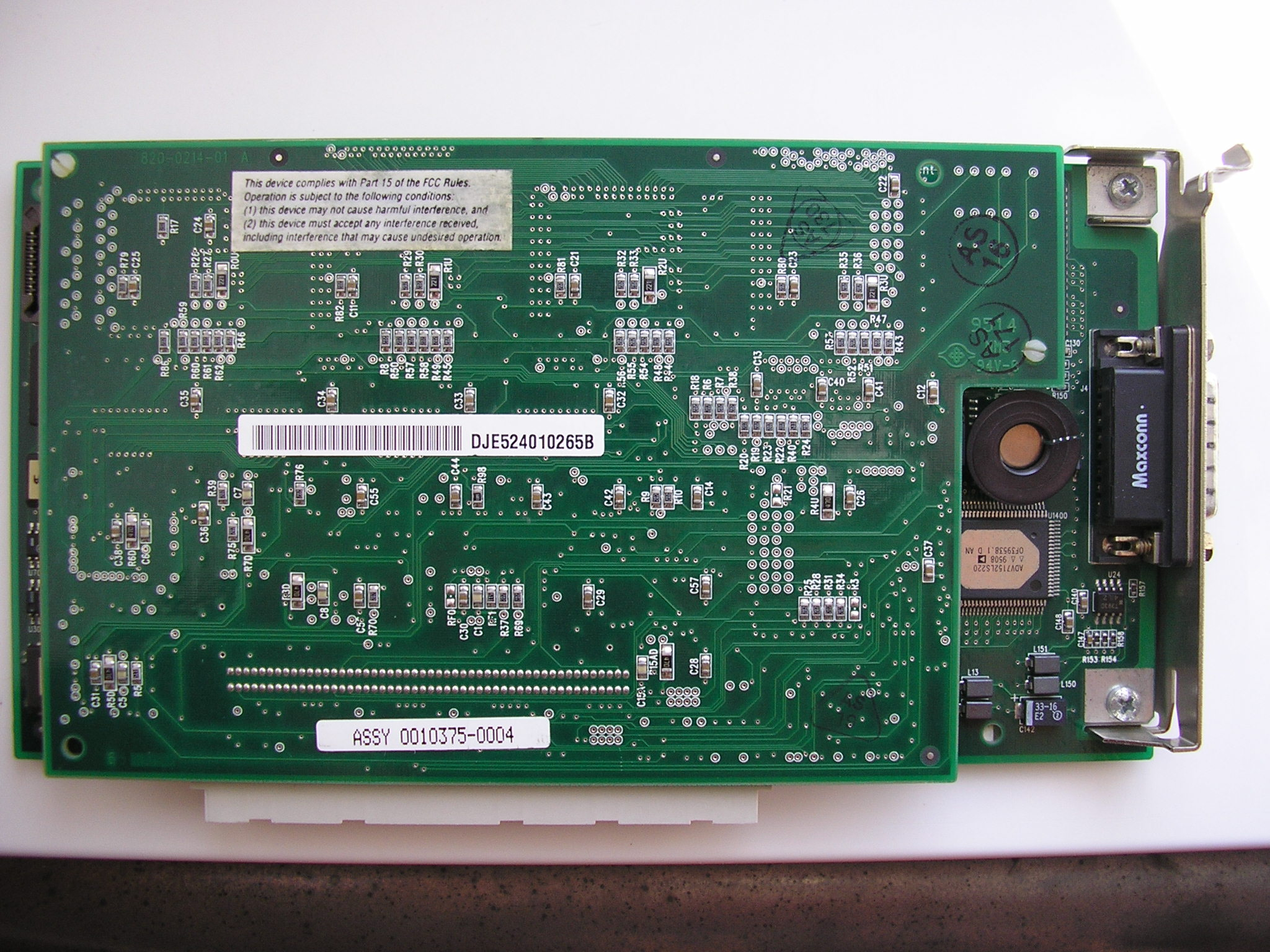
Radius Thunder IV GX 1600 NuBus graphics accelerator

The first Radius product was the Radius Full Page Display, one of the first large screens available for any personal computer. First available for the Macintosh Plus and Macintosh 512Ke, it pioneered the concept of putting multiple screens in a single coordinate space, allowing users to drag windows between multiple screens. This was a concept that Apple later incorporated into the Macintosh II. The firmware was written by Andy Hertzfeld while Burrell Smith developed the hardware. In its first 12 month of shipments, Radius achieved US$1-million per-month sales.

The second Radius product was the Radius Accelerator, an add-on card that quadrupled the speed of the Macintosh by adding a Motorola 68020 processor.

Another product was the Pivot Display: a full-page display that rotated between landscape and portrait orientation with real-time remapping of the menus, mouse and screen drawing. The award-winning product design was by Terry Oyama, former ID lead at Apple Computer.

Radius's graphics accelerator products included the QuickColor and QuickCAD boards. Using an ARM processor, this being specifically the VL86C010 device also known as the ARM2 and used in the Acorn Archimedes series of computers, QuickColor offered a claimed 600 percent speed increase in screen drawing operations, although observed performance gains were more modest. Designed to work with products such as the Radius Color Display, the QuickColor was able to access the framebuffer of the display board at a much higher rate - by employing block transfers - than that achieved in an unaccelerated system utilising numerous separate data transfers over the NuBus expansion bus. Various "bottleneck" QuickDraw operations were implemented using routines running on the QuickColor board. Such reimplemented routines were claimed to run 50% faster on the QuickColor board whose ARM processor ran "a multi-tasking RISC operating system". QuickCAD was described as "a superset of Radius's QuickColor", offering display list processing in a fashion similar to that of existing coprocessors - already available for IBM PC-compatible systems - such as the TMS34010.

By late 1992, the company faced hard times. It faced multiple shareholder lawsuits, accusing senior managers of extensive insider trading weeks before announcing the company's first unprofitable quarter; several failed R&D projects; a black eye from its bug-ridden Radius Rocket product; and a lack of market focus.

In 1993, following the company's first round of layoffs, the strategy was to live off the professional graphics market but build the video business. The company's first acquisition was VideoFusion, as Radius sought a toehold in the world of video production software. The company's engineering management was given the opportunity to partner with or acquire After Effects (originally by CoSA, but acquired by Aldus Corporation and later Adobe Systems) but declined. Thus it missed the chance to own a product that would come to define the first decade of digital video.

In August 1994, Radius acquired rival SuperMac Technologies in an $80.5 million stock swap agreement, and shifted headquarters into the latter's building. The SuperMac Technologies acquisition netted Radius the Cinepak video compression codec, which was still supported by most encoders and almost all media players by the early 2000s. The acquisitions continued with Pipeline Digital and its professional time code and video tape deck control software.

The advent of Macintosh computers with PCI expansion slots in 1995 saw the end of vendors that made expansion cards exclusively for Macintosh computers. With minor tweaks and new firmware, PC expansion card vendors were able to produce expansion cards for Mac OS computers. With their far greater production volumes from the PC side of the business, vendors such as ATI, Matrox, and others were easily able to undercut the prices of Macintosh-only vendors such as Radius.

In March 1995, Radius became the first licensed Macintosh clone vendor, and offered two new products: the Radius System 100 and the Radius 81/110. Radius licensed the brand name "SuperMac" to Umax in 1996 for their Mac OS clones.

In 1997, Radius introduced EditDV, a video editing software program that accompanied its FireWire cards, which was named "The Best Video Tool of 1998". In the same year, Radius acquired Reply Corporation, a San Jose–based maker of aftermarket motherboards and x86 compatibility cards for Macintosh computers.

In August 1998, the Radius monitor division and its trademark was acquired by miro Displays with the help of its major shareholder, Korea Data Systems (KDS), and was used in its line of CRT and LCD monitors.

On Jan. 6, 1999, the company changed its name to Digital Origin and returned to making video editing hardware and software, including EditDV. In 2002, it was acquired by Media 100 in an $83 million stock deal.

== Alumni ==
- Mike Boich
- Ed Colligan
- Andy Hertzfeld
- Burrell Smith
