= Steve Jobs: The Man in the Machine =

2015 documentary film directed by Alex Gibney

- Release poster
- Directed by: Alex Gibney
- Written by: Alex Gibney
- Produced by: Viva Van Loock; Alex Gibney
- Narrated by: Alex Gibney
- Cinematography: Sam Painter; Yutaka Yamazaki
- Edited by: Michael J. Palmer
- Music by: Will Bates
- Production companies: CNN Films; Jigsaw Productions
- Distributed by: Magnolia Pictures
- Release date: March 14, 2015 (SXSW)
- Running time: 128 minutes
- Country: United States
- Language: English
- Box office: $494,506

Steve Jobs: The Man in the Machine is a 2015 documentary film about Steve Jobs directed and produced by Alex Gibney. After its world premiere in the Headliners section of the South by Southwest film festival on March 14, 2015, the film was released in limited release to theaters and on VOD on September 4, 2015. It received generally positive reviews from critics.

== Cast ==
- Bob Belleville
- Chrisann Brennan
- Nolan Bushnell
- Andy Grignon
- Daniel Kottke
- Fred Anderson
- Steve Jobs (archival)
- Michael S. Malone
- Regis McKenna
- Michael Moritz
- Joe Nocera
- Jon Rubinstein
- Avie Tevanian
- Sherry Turkle
- Steve Wozniak (archival)
- Narrator: Alex Gibney

== Cultural references ==
The documentary features Jobs' 1983 Apple keynote address introduction to the famous 1984 Super Bowl XVIII advertisement directed by Ridley Scott, during a look at the history of the Apple Macintosh, and includes behind-the-scenes footage of the making of the advertisement.

In one segment the documentary shows the iPod nano advertisement that features Canadian singer Feist performing her single 1234 which helped both the nano and song gain notice in popular culture.

When examining Apple's iPod and iPhone products, footage from the 1991 Wim Wenders film Until the End of the World is shown to highlight the social implications these products have had on human interaction and isolation.

== Release ==
It had its world premiere in the Headliners section of the South by Southwest on March 14, 2015. It was released in limited release to theaters by Magnolia Pictures and on VOD by Magnolia Home Entertainment on September 4, 2015.

== Reception ==
On Rotten Tomatoes, the film holds an approval rating of 75%, based on 77 reviews, with an average rating of 7.0/10. The website's consensus reads, "Steve Jobs: Man in the Machine offers absorbing viewing, even if it doesn't delve deeply into its complex subject." On Metacritic, the film holds a weighted average score of 72 out of 100, based on 20 critics, indicating "generally favorable reviews".

Writing on behalf of Roger Ebert's website, Godfrey Cheshire awarded the documentary three out of four stars, praising Gibney's "cinematic virtue" to include some "very emotional interview material that couldn't be equaled by the printed page" (referring to journalist and author Walter Isaacson's biographical book Steve Jobs).
