= Boris RED =

Boris RED is an integrated 3D compositing, titling, and effects application that works with the Adobe Creative Suite, Avid, Apple, Grass Valley, Media 100 and Sony editing systems. RED adds features to NLE timelines and integrates a standalone engine for effects creation and rendering.

== Features ==
64-bit Support Boris RED 5 adds support for 64-bit video editing applications such as Adobe Premiere Pro CS5.5 and CS5, Adobe After Effects CS5.5 and CS5 (Windows), and Sony Vegas Pro v11 and v10.

Final Effects Complete Filters 40 filters added to RED from Boris Final Effects Complete.

Quality Image Restoration Added quality image restoration tools such as: Noise Reduction, Smooth Tone, Pixel Fixer, DV Fixer,

3D Particle Effects Added Particle Array 3D and Pin Art filters.

UpRez Added SD to HD quality converter.

3-Way Color Grade Added filter which color grades video footage. The filter also has masking and keying tools to isolate areas of secondary color correction.

Lens Blur The multi-core optimized lens blur filter emulates the circular or multi-sided iris shaped highlights that are generated with real camera lenses.

Lens Shape The multi-processor accelerated BCC Lens Shape filter to generate stylized image highlights that take their shape from an alternate alpha image source.

Lens Transition The multi-processor accelerated BCC Lens Transition filter automatically generates a stylized transition between a pair of image clips.

Swish Pan The BCC Swish Pan transition emulates panning a camera in a 180 degree arc, creating the look of a fast blur between the outgoing and the incoming clips.

Stylized Effects New OpenGL-accelerated effects include: LED, Damaged TV, Tile Mosaic, Scan Lines, Prism, Lightning, Glare, Glint, Glitter, and Lens Flare.

Painterly Effects Simulate pencil-sketched images, the wash look of a water color painting, a rotoscope toon-animation look, and charcoal drawings.

== Effects ==
The latest version of Boris RED contains the following Boris Continuum Complete (BCC) effects:

3D Objects	Art Looks	Blur and Sharpen	Color and Tone	Film Style
BCC Extruded EPS	BCC Artist’s Poster	BCC Directional Blur	BCC 3 Way Color Grade	BCC DeInterlace
BCC Extruded Spline	BCC Bump Map	BCC Gaussian Blur	BCC Brightness-Contrast	BCC Film Damage
BCC Extruded Text	BCC Cartoon Look	BCC Lens Blur	BCC Color Balance	BCC Film Grain
BCC Layer Deformer	BCC Cartooner	BCC Lens Shape	BCC Color Correction	BCC Film Process
BCC Type On Text	BCC Charcoal Sketch	BCC Motion Blur	BCC Color Match	BCC Film Glow
	BCC Halftone	BCC Pyramid Blur	BCC Color Palette	BCC Match Grain
	BCC Median	BCC Radial Blur	BCC Colorize	
	BCC Pencil Sketch	BCC Spiral Blur	BCC Correct Selected Color	
	BCC Posterize	BCC Unsharp Mask	BCC Hue-Saturation-Lightness	
	BCC Spray Paint Noise	BCC Z Blur	BCC Invert Solarize	
	BCC Tile Mosaic		BCC Levels Gamma	
	BCC Water Color		BCC MultiTone Mixer	
			BCC Safe Colors	
			BCC Tritone	
			BCC Video Scope	
Image Restoration	Key & Blend	Lights	Match Move	Obsolete
BCC Dust and Scratches	BCC Alpha Process	BCC Alpha Spotlight	BCC Corner Pin	BCC Blur
BCC DV Fixer	BCC Boost Blend	BCC Edge Lighting	BCC Match Move	BCC Degrain
BCC Flicker Fixer	BCC Chroma Key	BCC Glare	BCC Witness Protection	BCC DeNoise
BCC Motion Key	BCC Composite	BCC Glint		BCC Glow
BCC Noise Reduction	BCC Composite Choker	BCC Glitter		BCC Lens Flare
BCC Optical Stabilizer	BCC Glow Matte	BCC Lens Flare 3D		BCC Lens Flare Advanced
BCC Pixel Fixer	BCC Light Matte	BCC Lightning		BCC Light Zoom
BCC Smooth Tone	BCC Light Wrap	BCC Light Sweep		BCC Noise Map
BCC UpRez	BCC Linear Color Key	BCC Rays Cartoon		BCC Particle System
BCC Wire Remover	BCC Linear Luma Key	BCC Rays Puffy		BCC Rough Glow
	BCC Make Alpha Key	BCC Rays Radiant Edges		
	BCC Matte Choker	BCC Rays Radiant Spotlight		
	BCC Matte Cleanup	BCC Rays Ring		
	BCC PixelChooser	BCC Rays Ripply		
	BCC Premult	BCC Rays Streaky		
	BCC RGB Blend	BCC Rays Textured		
	BCC Star Matte	BCC Rays Wedge		
	BCC Super Blend	BCC Reverse Spotlight		
	BCC Two Way Key	BCC Spotlight		
		BCC Stage Light		
Particles	Perspective	Stylize	Textures	Time
BCC 2D Particles	BCC 3D Extruded Image Shatter	BCC Alpha Pixel Noise	BCC Brick	BCC Beat Reactor
BCC Comet	BCC 3D Image Shatter	BCC Color Choker	BCC Caustics	BCC Jitter Basic
BCC Organic Strands	BCC Cube	BCC Colorize Glow	BCC Cloth	BCC Jitter
BCC Particle Array 3D	BCC Cylinder	BCC Damaged TV	BCC Clouds	BCC Looper
BCC Particle Emitter 3D	BCC DVE Basic	BCC Drop Shadow	BCC Fractal Noise	BCC Optical Flow
BCC Pin Art 3D	BCC DVE	BCC Emboss	BCC Granite	BCC Posterize Time
BCC Rain	BCC Fast Flipper	BCC Glow Alpha Edges	BCC Mixed Colors	BCC Sequencer
BCC Snow	BCC Page Turn	BCC LED	BCC Noise Map 2	BCC Temporal Blur
BCC Sparks	BCC Pan And Zoom	BCC Misalignment	BCC Rays	BCC Time Displacement
BCC Wild Cards	BCC Sphere	BCC Mosaic	BCC Reptilian	BCC Trails Basic
	BCC Z Space 1	BCC Multi Shadow	BCC Rock	BCC Trails
	BCC Z Space 2	BCC Prism	BCC Stars	BCC Velocity Remap
	BCC Z Space 3	BCC RGB Edges	BCC Steel Plate	
		BCC RGB Pixel Noise	BCC Veined Marble	
		BCC Scanline	BCC Weave	
		BCC Scatterize	BCC Wood Grain	
			BCC Wooden Planks	
Transitions	Warp			
BCC Burnt Film	BCC Bulge			
BCC Criss-Cross Wipe	BCC Displacement Map			
BCC Lens Transition	BCC Morph			
BCC Linear Wipe	BCC Polar Displacement			
BCC Multi Stretch Wipe	BCC Ripple			
BCC Multi Stripe Wipe	BCC Turbulence			
BCC Radial Wipe	BCC Twirl			
BCC Rectangular Wipe	BCC Vector Displacement			
BCC Sphere Transition	BCC Video Morph			
BCC Swish Pan	BCC Warp			
BCC Textured Wipe	BCC Wave			

The latest version of Boris RED contains the following Boris Final Effects Complete effects:

Blur and Sharpen	Distortion	Edges	Particle	Stylize	Transitions
Rectangular Scale Wipe	Bend It	Burn Edges	Ball Action	3d Relief	Blur Dissolve
Vector Blur	Bender	Gradient Blur	Bubbles	Mr Smoothie	Grid Wipe
	Bulge	Sparkle Edges	Rain	Reptile	Griddler
	EZ Lazy Waves	Spot Blur	Snow		Jaws
	Flow Motion	Spot Feather			Light
	Griddler	Spot Frame			Pin Wipe
	Lens	Spot Tatter			RGB Dissolve
	Slant	Spot Turbulence			Slant Wipe
	Split	Wiggle Edges			Spherize Wipe
	Split 2				Twister
	Tiler				
	Water Waves				
