= Burrell Smith =

American engineer (born 1955)

- Born: December 16, 1955 (age 70)
- Occupation: Computer engineer
- Known for: Macintosh

Burrell Carver Smith (born December 16, 1955) is a retired American computer engineer who created the first wire wrap prototype of the motherboard for the original Macintosh at Apple Computer. He became Apple employee #282 in February 1979 as an Apple II service technician. He designed the motherboard for Apple's LaserWriter.

Smith was working in Apple's service department when he helped Bill Atkinson add more memory to an Apple II computer in an innovative fashion. Atkinson recommended him to Jef Raskin, who, along with Steve Wozniak, was looking for a hardware engineer for their newly formed Macintosh project. As a member of the design team, Smith prototyped five different motherboards using techniques based on Programmable Array Logic (PAL) chips to achieve maximum functionality with a minimal chip count and cost. His signature is molded into the original Macintosh case, along with the signatures of the rest of the Macintosh team.

Smith left the company before the release of Apple's Turbo Mac design platform, with an internal hard drive and a further simplified chipset.

He co-founded Radius Inc.

== Personal life ==
Smith is retired and lives in Palo Alto.

He reportedly had bipolar disorder during the 1990s. In 1993, he was accused of "breaking windows, throwing a firecracker and leaving letters at the house" of Steve Jobs and the case was dropped when he accepted treatment. Actor Lenny Jacobson portrayed him in the 2013 film Jobs.
