= Dayna Communications =

American computer company (1984–1997)

Dayna Communications, Inc.
- Type: Private
- Industry: Computers
- Founded: November 2, 1984; 42 years ago in Salt Lake City, Utah, United States
- Founder: William Sadleir
- Defunct: October 10, 1997; 29 years ago
- Fate: Acquired by Intel
- Number of employees: ≈ 73 (1997)
- Website: dayna.com (archived)

Dayna Communications, Inc., was a privately held American computer company, active from 1984 to 1997 and based in Salt Lake City, Utah. It primarily manufactured networking products for Apple Computer's computing platforms, including the Macintosh, PowerBook and Newton (although some of its later networking products were platform-independent and could work on PCI-based IBM PC compatibles). In 1997, the company was acquired by Intel for nearly $14 million.

== History ==
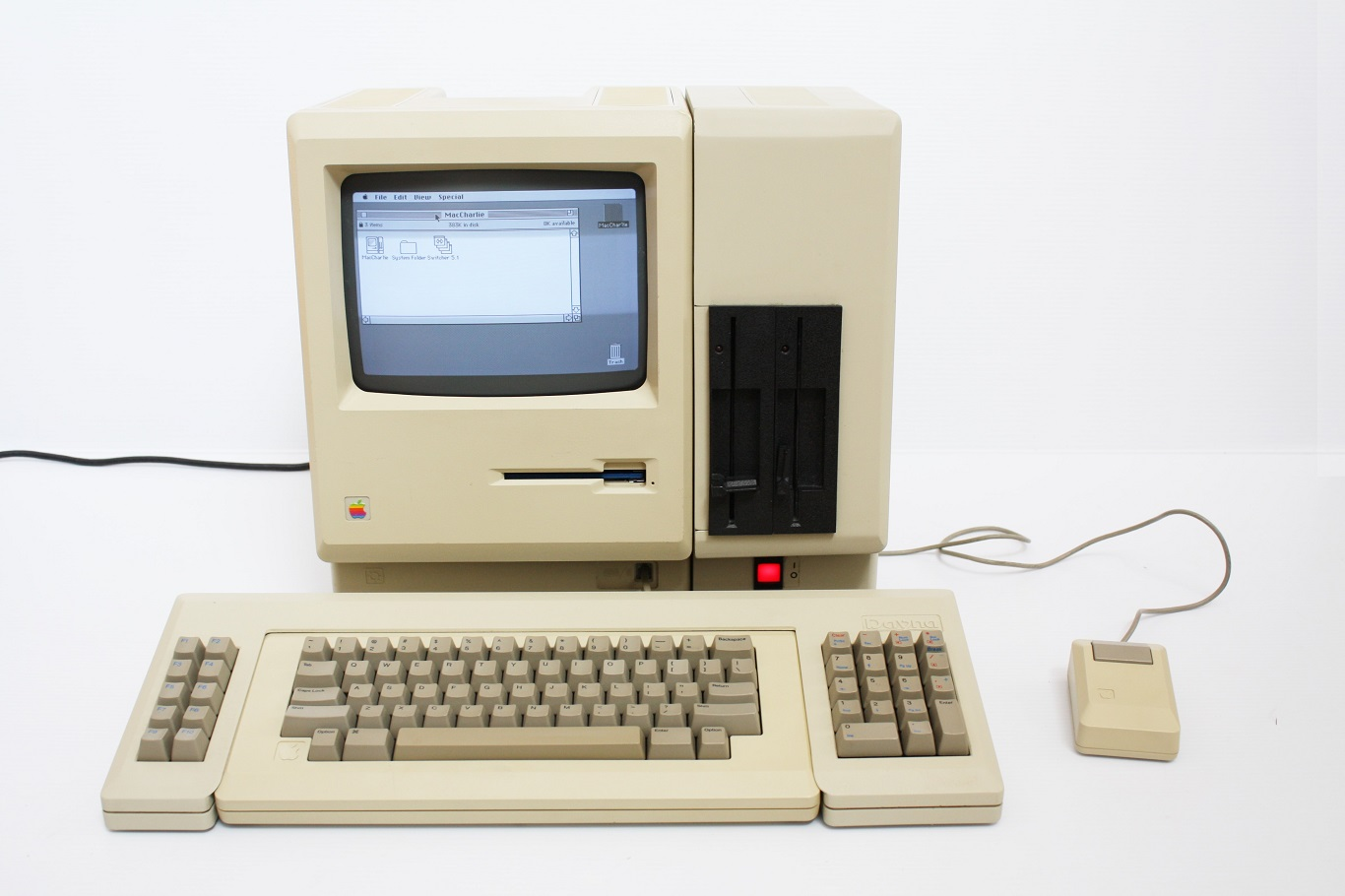
A MacCharlie (right) running on a Macintosh 512K (left)

Dayna Communications was founded by William Sadleir in Salt Lake City in 1984, with $1.6 million in start-up capital.

In May 1985, the company delivered the MacCharlie, a hardware add-on for the Macintosh 128K that was essentially a headless IBM PC clone, complete with one or two 5.25-inch floppy drives, that clipped onto the side of the Mac. It connected to the Mac via a serial cable; users could run PC software through a terminal application provided through included floppy disks. The product received positive reviews, with The New York Times calling it "a brilliant idea" that gave Apple the potential to "grow in businesses or households already committed to IBM hardware and software". The product was however a market failure, with Sadleir overspending on advertising while ignoring the needs of customers he had surveyed, the majority of which specifically wanted a means of transferring files captured in the IBM PC's FAT filesystem to the Mac while not necessarily desiring a means of running IBM PC software on the Mac. Dayna nearly went bankrupt amid debt to creditors, but after securing $2.5 million in investment capital from Norman Lear of Act III Communications, Sadleir was able to avoid Chapter 11 bankruptcy before releasing the FT100, a retooling of the MacCharlie that leaned on the file interoperability aspect of the MacCharlie while removing any unnecessary components. It sold for less than half the street price of the MacCharlie and even reused the latter's packaging. Released in November 1986, only 400 were sold within eight weeks, or a quarter of what the company expected to sell.

In January 1987, the company received $250,000 in cash from Frank C. Brooks, an investor based in Greenwich, Connecticut, who planned to raise even more capital for Dayna with contributions from Brooks's former contacts at Morgan Guaranty Trust. However, those contacts were hesitant to infuse Dayna with cash owing to its lopsided financial situation—$12 million in valuation against $6.3 million in debt. Those contacts requested that Dayna get its debtors to accept a lower bid for recuperations. Those same debtors requested that Dayna increase its cash flow in order to convince them that Dayna could stand to repay their debt, leading to a catch-22 situation. As the company had too few resources to pay off its debt to creditors in liquidation proceedings, Sadleir would have had to file for personal bankruptcy. At the last minute, he leveraged an overlooked contact with an executive at Novell Inc., a nearby software company located in Provo, to have the latter sign on to a licensing deal with Dayna in order to market Novell's NetWare network operating system for Macintosh users. After the deal went through in May 1987, Lear flushed Dayna with a $2 million credit line, in exchange for royalties in the Novell-backed product.

This finally gave Sadleir enough money to restructure Dayna: debts were relinquished to early investors after paying them a combined $300,000, and their largest creditor—themselves going through bankruptcy—relinquished their $1.2 million debt note after Dayna had given them $160,000, a spot for a large booth at MacWorld, and $690,000 of preferred stock. A retooled version of the VT100, dubbed the DaynaFile, was released in late 1987 and was vastly more successful. By 1988, the company was up to about 30 employees and had monthly sales of between $600,000 and $800,000 that year. Meanwhile, the Novell collaboration eventually bore fruit with DaynaNet, a network operating system for the Mac based on and featuring interoperability with NetWare. In 1990, Novell signed another agreement with Dayna for the latter to manufacture and market LocalTalk-based Mac network adapters for NetWare, replacing Novell's own offerings. By the mid-1990s Dayna was a recognized market leader for fax and Ethernet modems for the Macintosh and PowerBook. In 1996, they released a wireless LAN PC Card for the Newton, a PDA released by Apple several years prior.

In September 1997, Intel announced it would acquire Dayna Communications for roughly $14 million in a stock swap. Most of its 73 staffers transferred over to Intel's headquarters, the latter seeking expertise in small-business networking products. Dayna existed as a subsidiary of Intel beginning on October 10 of that year. Dayna's remaining inventory continued to be sold until 1998, when their product lines were rebranded as Intel offerings. Dayna was formally dissolved on December 28, 1998.
