= Bruce Horn =

Computer programmer

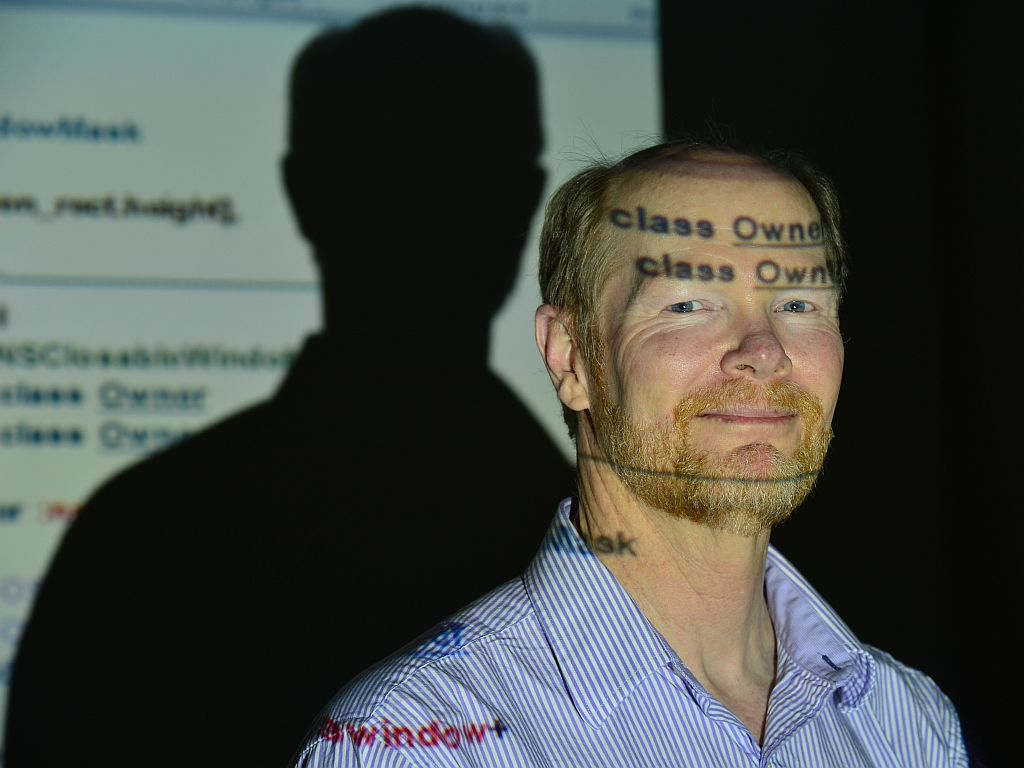
Horn in 2013

Bruce Lawrence Horn (born August 18, 1959) is an American software engineer. He created the original Macintosh Finder and the Macintosh Resource Manager for Apple Computer. His signature is molded into the case of the Macintosh 128K alongside the rest of the Macintosh development team. He has been a distinguished engineer with Siri and Language Technologies at Apple since June 2022.

Horn was a member of the original Apple Macintosh design team. He received a B.S. in Mathematical Sciences from Stanford University in 1982 and a M.S. and Ph.D. from Carnegie-Mellon University in Computer Science in 1994. Horn was a student in the Learning Research Group (1973–1981), where Smalltalk was developed. While there, he worked on various projects including the NoteTaker, a portable Smalltalk machine, and wrote the initial Dorado Smalltalk microcode for Smalltalk.

He owns, and programs software for, Ingenuity Software. He was employed by Powerset as the principal development manager of the Natural Language Technology group. Powerset was acquired by Microsoft in the fall of 2008 and became part of Bing.

Horn was an Intel Fellow and Chief Scientist for Smart Device Innovation in the New Devices Group then became CTO, Saffron Technology Group at Intel Corporation.

Horn serves on the board of advisors of The Hyperwords Company Ltd of the UK, which works to make the web more usefully interactive and which has produced the free Firefox Add-On called 'Hyperwords'.
