= Bob Belleville =

American computer engineer

- Born: Robert L. Belleville
- Occupation: Software Manager at Apple (1982–1985)
- Years active: 1982–present

Robert L. Belleville is an American computer engineer who was an early head of engineering at Apple from 1982 until 1985.

Belleville worked at Xerox, where he was a primary designer of the hardware for the Xerox Star. Steve Jobs is said to have invited him to join Apple by saying, "Everything you've ever done in your life is shit, ... so why don't you come work for me?" In May 1982, he became software manager for the Macintosh 128K; in August that year he became engineering manager of the Macintosh division. As Apple Director of Engineering, he played a major role in developing the LaserWriter. He resigned from Apple in summer 1985 after Jobs announced his resignation, and later worked at Silicon Graphics.

In Alex Gibney's documentary Steve Jobs: The Man in the Machine, Belleville said that the pressure of working at Apple had ended his marriage and that Jobs "[was always apparently] seducing you, vilifying you, or ignoring you", but he cried when he recalled working for him.
