= MacCharlie =

PC accessory for the Macintosh

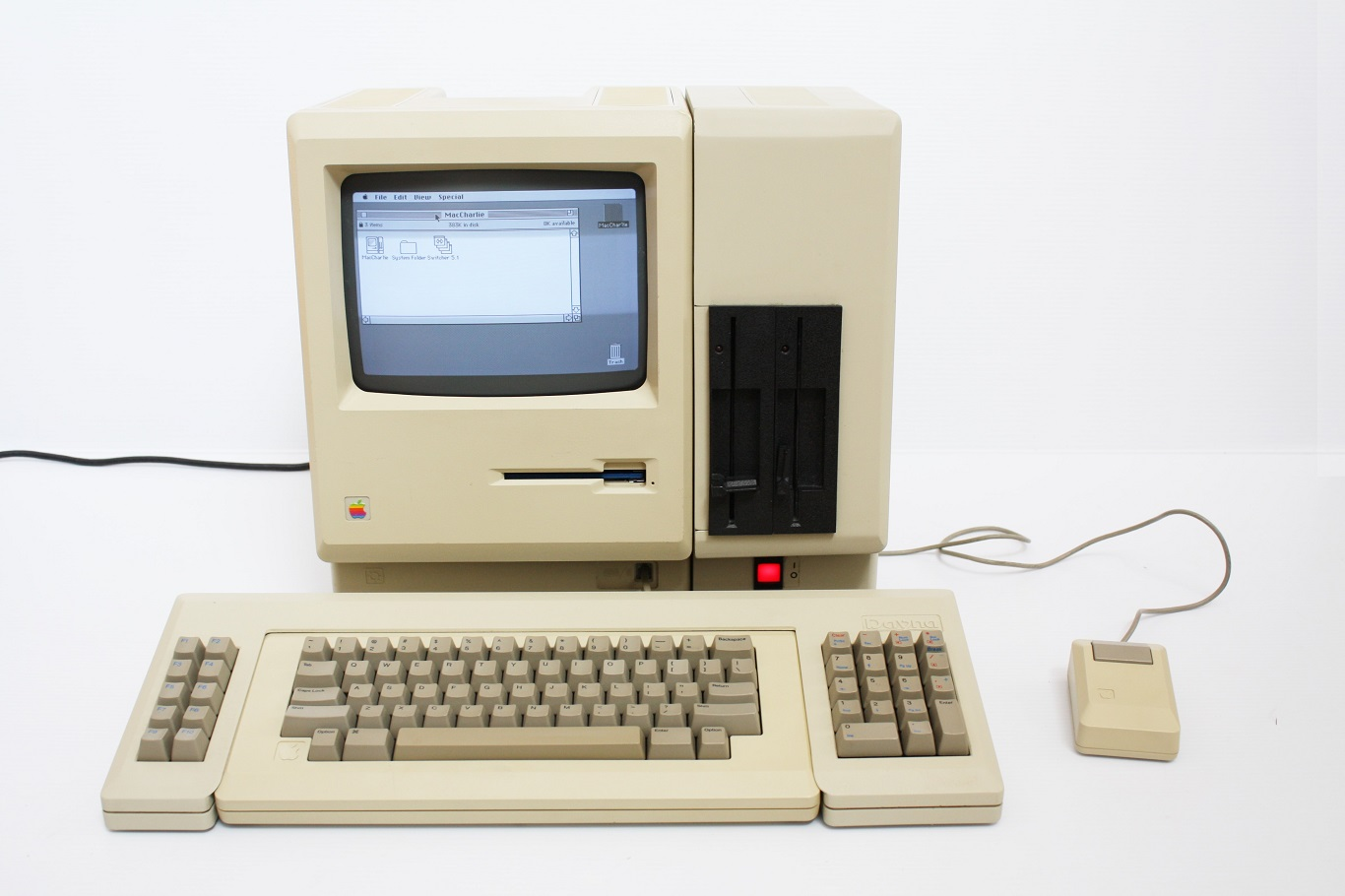
- MacCharlie (right) running on a Macintosh 512K (left)
- Connects to: Macintosh 128K, Macintosh 512K
- Manufacturer: Dayna Communications
- Introduced: April 2, 1985
- Discontinued: 1986/1987
- Cost: US$1,795 (equivalent to $5,400 in 2025)
- Type: Hardware emulation
- Memory: 256–512 KB
- Connection: DE-9 connector
- Weight: 7 lbs (3.2 kg)
- Dimensions: 13.8 by 14.7 by 10.8 inches (35 by 37 by 27 cm)

MacCharlie was a hardware add-on for the Macintosh 128K that was made by Dayna Communications. It allowed users to run MS-DOS software for the IBM PC by clipping a unit onto the chassis of the Macintosh 128K, and included a keyboard extender to provide the function keys and numeric keypad that are absent from Apple's original keyboard. The name refers to an IBM PC advertising campaign featuring Charlie Chaplin's "Little Tramp" character.

The clip-on unit sits to the side of the Mac and, like the contemporary Amiga Sidecar, contains essentially a complete IBM PC compatible with an 8088 processor, 256 KB of RAM (expandable to 640 KB) and a single 5.25" floppy disk drive that stores 360 KB. A second floppy drive could be added.

While running DOS software using MacCharlie, users could still access the Macintosh menu bar and desk accessories. However, the DOS environment, which ran in a window, was text-only and did not permit Macintosh applications to run concurrently while in use. MacCharlie used the Mac as a terminal, performing all DOS processing itself, and sent video data over a relatively slow serial link to the Mac for display. This slowness, coupled with the declining prices of real IBM PC compatibles, contributed to the short market life of the MacCharlie.

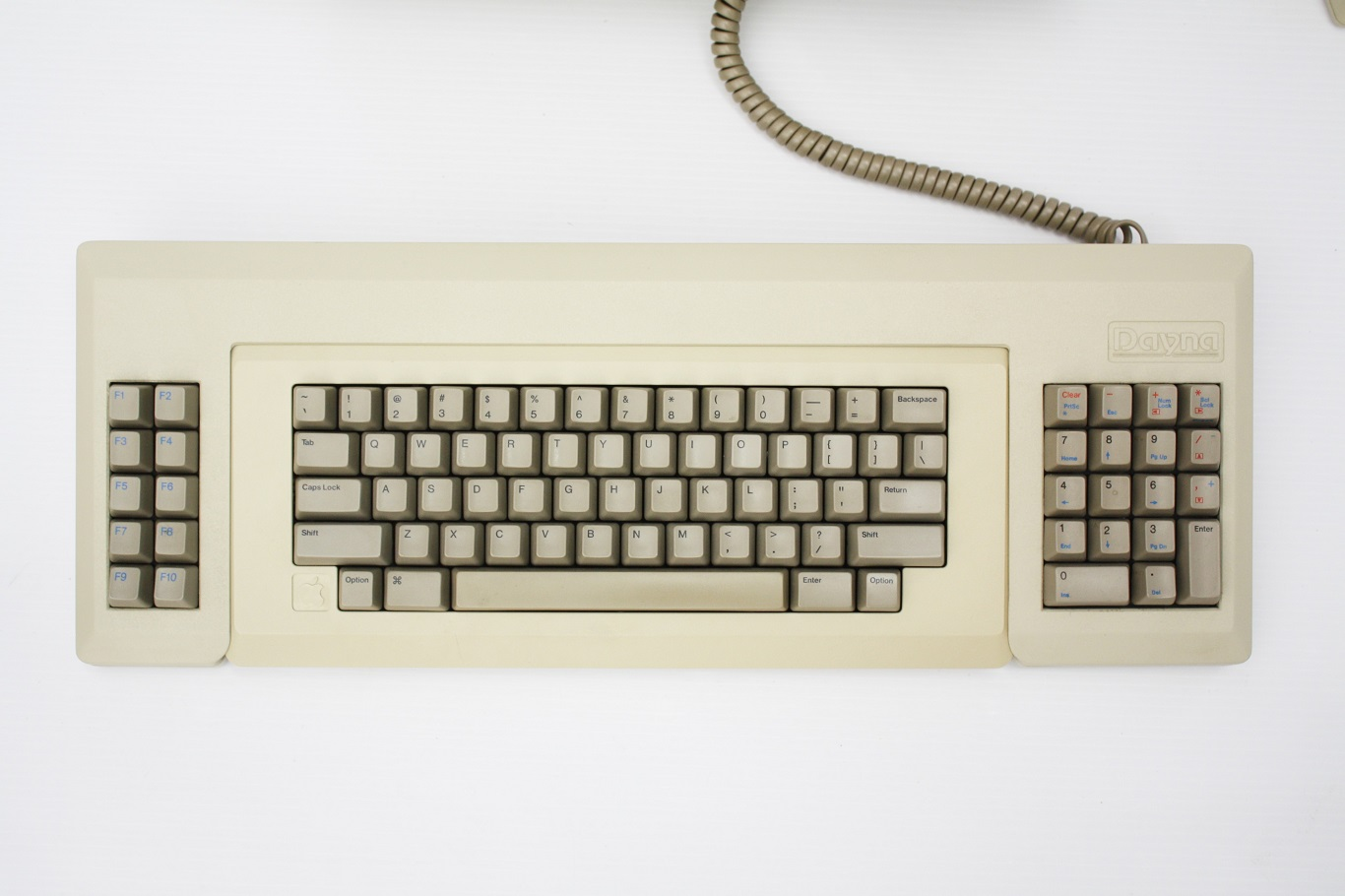
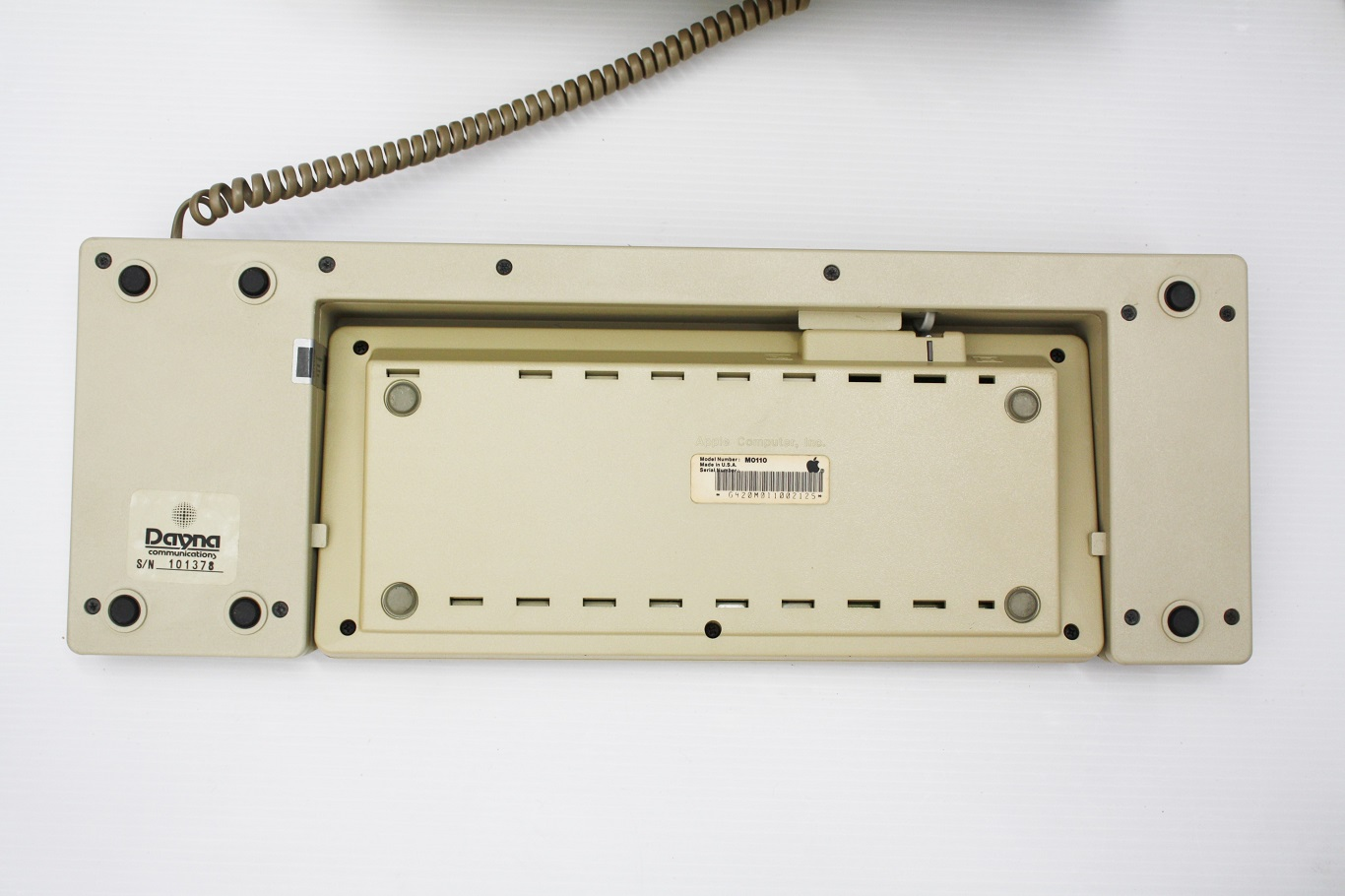
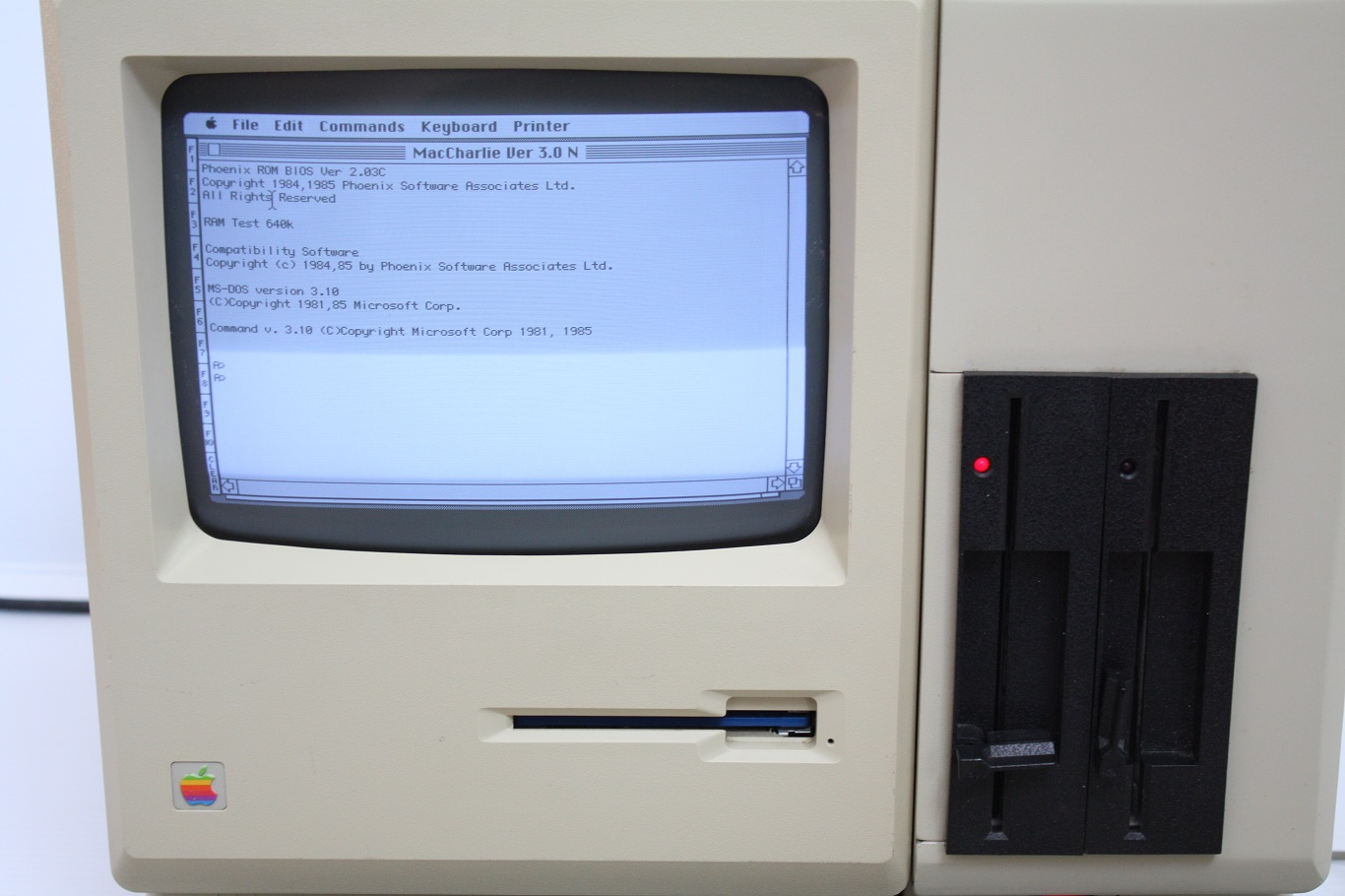
Clockwise from upper left: Keyboard extender attached to the original Macintosh keyboard; underside of both keyboards; MacCharlie's terminal program booting MS-DOS version 3.10.

== See also ==
- Amiga Sidecar
