= Media 100 =

Video editing software

Media 100 is a manufacturer of video editing software and non-linear editing systems designed for professional cutting and editing. The editing systems can be used with AJA Video Systems, Blackmagic or matrox hardware or as software-only solution with Firewire support and run exclusively on Macs. The current released software version is Media 100 Suite Version 2.1.8 and runs on macOS 10.14.x (Mojave), macOS 10.13.4 (High Sierra), macOS 10.12 (Sierra), OS X 10.11 (El Capitan), OS X 10.10 (Yosemite), OS X 10.6.7 (Snow Leopard), 10.7.x (Lion), 10.8.x (Mountain Lion), 10.9.x (Mavericks) and 10.10.x (Yosemite).

In the past, the editing systems were nearly exclusively based on custom hardware boards (vincent601/P6000/HDX) to be placed into Apple Macintosh computers, but Microsoft Windows-based systems were available as well (iFinish, 844/X). Media 100 was established as a division of Marlboro, Massachusetts-based Data Translation, Inc. then spun off as an independent company in 1996. After absorbing or merging with several companies (Terran Interactive, Digital Origin, and Wired, Inc.) it entered bankruptcy proceedings, with its assets and employees acquired by Optibase in March 2004. It is owned by Boris FX, which acquired the company from Optibase in October 2005.

== Legacy products ==
- Media 100 for 68K and PowerPC Macintosh computers with NuBus slots. This system used two cards connected internally by a pair of short ribbon cables, and a breakout box with two cables, one connecting to an external port on each card. The highest software version supported is 2.6.2
- "Vincent601", Media 100's first PCI version, released while the original NuBus model was still in production.
- Media 100i based on the vincent601 or P6000 PCI boards, latest version: 7.5 for Mac OS 9.x, 8.2.3 for Mac OS X 10.4.x.
- Media 100 ICE (an accelerator card for rendering certain effect plugins faster on Adobe After Effects, Avid, and Media 100's own systems)
- iFinish (Windows version of Media 100i, based on the same hardware)
- Media 100 qx (the i / iFinish without the software, for use with the Macintosh and Windows versions of Adobe Premiere)
- 844/x (Windows-based real-time editing and compositing system)
- HDx (Mac-based real-time editing and compositing system with realtime HD up-/downscaling)
- Cleaner and PowerSuite (an ICE accelerated version of Cleaner) Cleaner was previously known as Media Cleaner Pro and Movie Cleaner Pro and was owned by Terran Interactive. The Cleaner product line was subsequently sold to discreet/Autodesk.
- Media 100 HD Suite (Digital-only HDTV and SDTV NLE system)
- Media 100 HDe (Digital / Analog HDTV and SDTV NLE system)
- Media 100 SDe (Digital / Analog SDTV NLE system)
- Media 100 Producer (software-only version of Media 100 HD)
- Media 100 Producer Suite (software-only version of Media 100 HD with bundled Boris RED 4 plugin for graphics, titles, effects and so forth)
- Media 100 i Tune-Up (upgrade for the legacy Media100i SDTV NLE system),
- Final Effects Complete (a collection of effect plugins for Adobe After Effects)
- Media 100 Suite Version 1 (can be run with or without hardware; supported hardware: Media 100 HDx, Blackmagic, matrox and AJA Video Systems, Universal app runs on PPC as well as intel machines with Mac OS X 10.5.8 up to 10.6.7)

== Current products ==
- Media 100 Suite Version 2 (4k support, support for the Red Rocket accelerator, new motion editor, dropped support for PPC-based Macs, includes Boris RED 5 for titling/vector graphics)
