= Macintosh 128K =

First model of Apple's Macintosh computer line

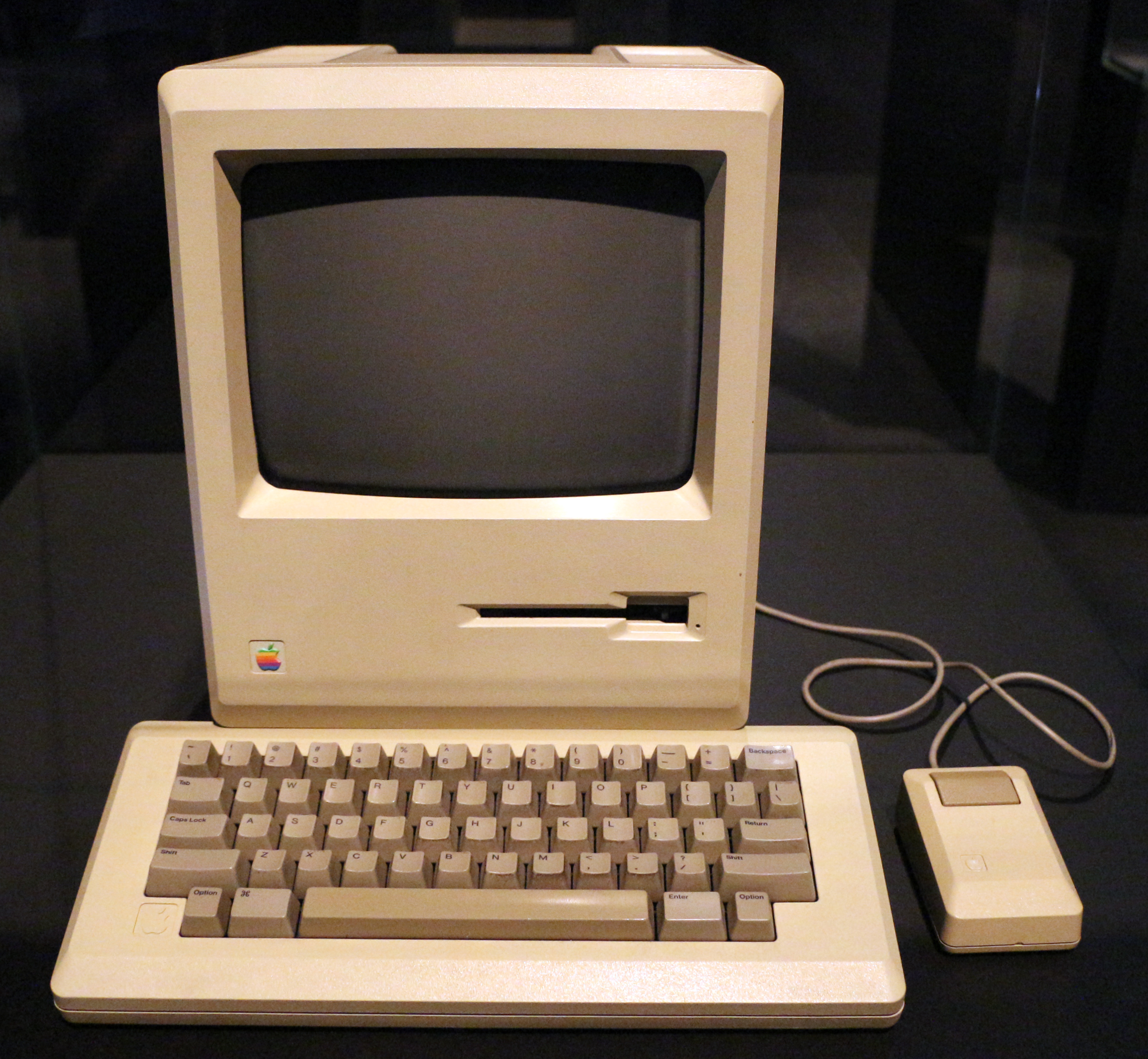
- Also known as: Macintosh; Thin Mac; M0001
- Manufacturer: Apple Computer
- Product family: Compact Macintosh
- Type: All-in-one
- Released: January 24, 1984; 42 years ago
- Introductory price: US$2,495 (equivalent to $7,700 in 2025)
- Discontinued: October 1, 1985
- Operating system: System 1–3.2
- CPU: Motorola 68000 @ 7.8336 MHz
- Memory: 128 KB
- Removable storage: 3 1/2-inch 400K floppy disk
- Display: 9-inch (23 cm) monochrome, 512 × 342
- Dimensions: Height: 13.6 in (35 cm); Width: 9.6 in (24 cm); Depth: 10.9 in (28 cm)
- Weight: 16.5 lb (7.5 kg)
- Successor: Macintosh 512K
- Made in: USA

The Macintosh, later rebranded as the Macintosh 128K, is the original Macintosh personal computer from Apple. It is the first successful mass-market all-in-one desktop personal computer with a graphical user interface, built-in screen and mouse. It was pivotal in establishing desktop publishing as a general office function. A motherboard, a 9 in (23 cm) monochrome CRT monitor, and a floppy drive are all integrated into a beige case with an integrated carrying handle. As for peripherals, it has a keyboard and single-button mouse.

The Macintosh was introduced by a television commercial titled "1984" during Super Bowl XVIII on January 22, 1984, directed by Ridley Scott. Sales were strong at its initial release on January 24, 1984, at US$2,495 (equivalent to $7,700 in 2025), and reached 70,000 units on May 3, 1984. Upon the release of its successor, the Macintosh 512K, it was rebranded as the Macintosh 128K.

== Development ==
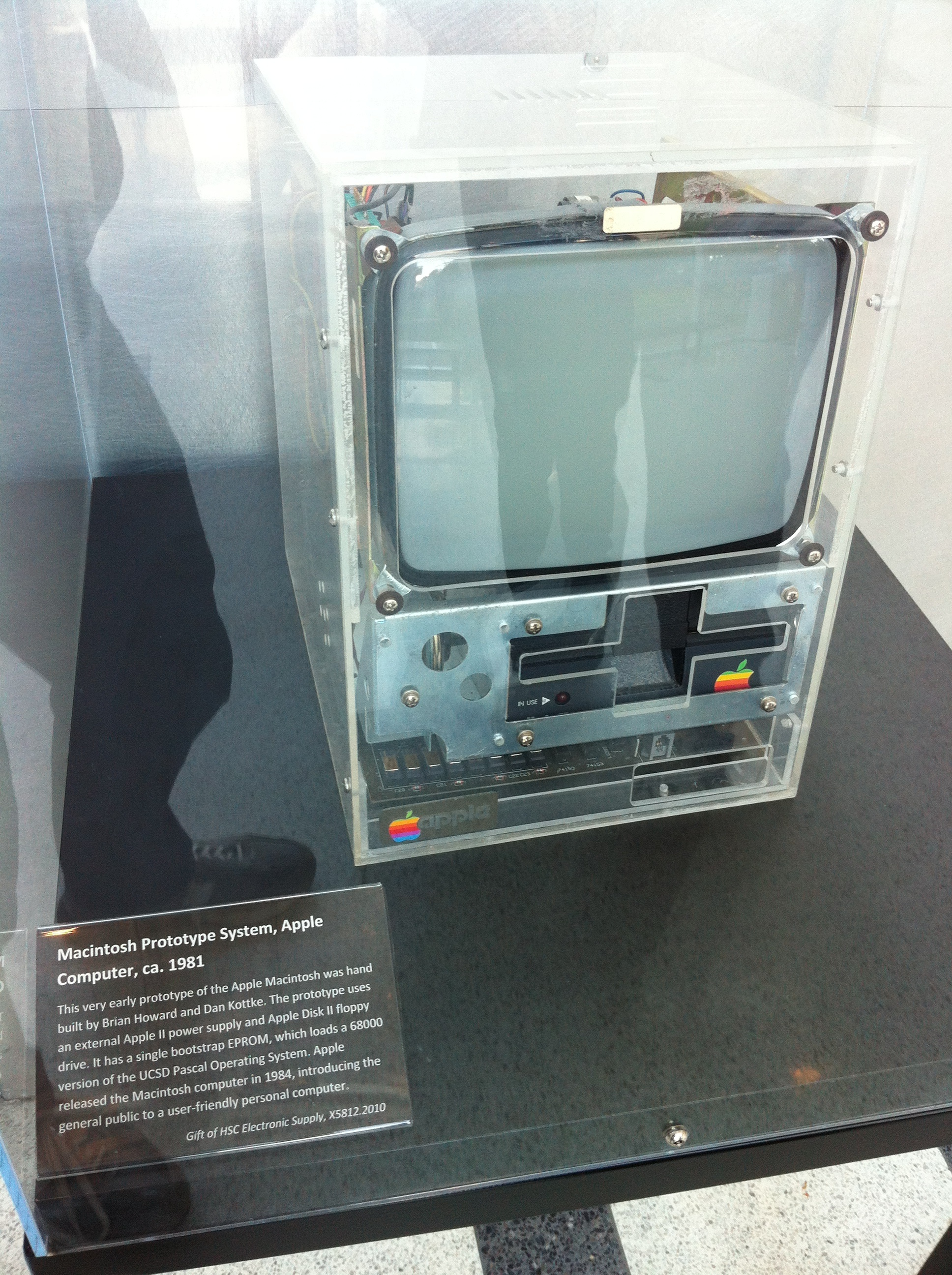
A Macintosh prototype from 1981 is at the Computer History Museum.

=== 1978–1984: Development ===
In 1978, Apple began to organize the Lisa project, to build a next-generation machine similar to an advanced Apple II or the yet-to-be-introduced IBM PC. In 1979, Apple co-founder Steve Jobs learned of the advanced work on graphical user interfaces (GUI) taking place at Xerox PARC. He arranged for Apple engineers to be allowed to visit PARC to see the systems in action. The Lisa was immediately redirected to use a GUI, which at that time was well beyond the state of the art for microprocessor abilities; the Xerox Alto has a custom processor spanning several circuit boards in a case the size of a small refrigerator. Things had changed dramatically with the introduction of the 16/32-bit Motorola 68000 in 1979, with at least an order of magnitude better performance than existing designs, making a software GUI machine a practical possibility. The basic layout of the Lisa was largely complete by 1982, at which point Jobs's continual suggestions for improvements led to him being kicked off the project.

At the same time that the Lisa was becoming a GUI machine in 1979, Jef Raskin began the Macintosh project. The design at that time was for a low-cost, easy-to-use machine for the average consumer. Instead of a GUI, it intended to use a text-based user interface that allowed multitasking, and special command keys on the keyboard that accessed standardized commands in the programs. Bud Tribble, a member of the Macintosh team, asked Burrell Smith to integrate the Apple Lisa's 68k microprocessor into the Macintosh so that it could run graphical programs. By December 1980, Smith had succeeded in designing a board that integrated an 8 MHz Motorola 68k. Smith's design used less RAM than the Lisa, which made producing the board significantly more cost-efficient. The final Mac design was self-contained and had the complete QuickDraw picture language and interpreter in 64 KB of ROM – far more than most other computers which typically had around 4 to 8 KB of ROM; it had 128 kB of RAM, in the form of sixteen 64-kilobit (kb) RAM modules soldered to the logic board. The final product's screen was a 9-inch (23 cm), 512×342 pixel monochrome display.

Smith's innovative design, combining the low production cost of an Apple II with the computing power of Lisa's Motorola 68000 CPU, began to receive Jobs's attentions. Jobs took over the Macintosh project after deciding that the Macintosh was more marketable than the Lisa, which led former project leader Raskin to leave the team in 1981. Apple co-founder Steve Wozniak, who had been leading the project with Raskin, was on temporary leave from the company at this time due to an airplane crash he had experienced earlier that year, making it easier for Jobs to take over the program. After development had completed, team member and engineer Andy Hertzfeld said that the final Macintosh design is closer to Jobs's ideas than Raskin's. InfoWorld in September 1981 reported on the existence of the secret Lisa and "McIntosh" projects at Apple.

=== 1984: Debut ===
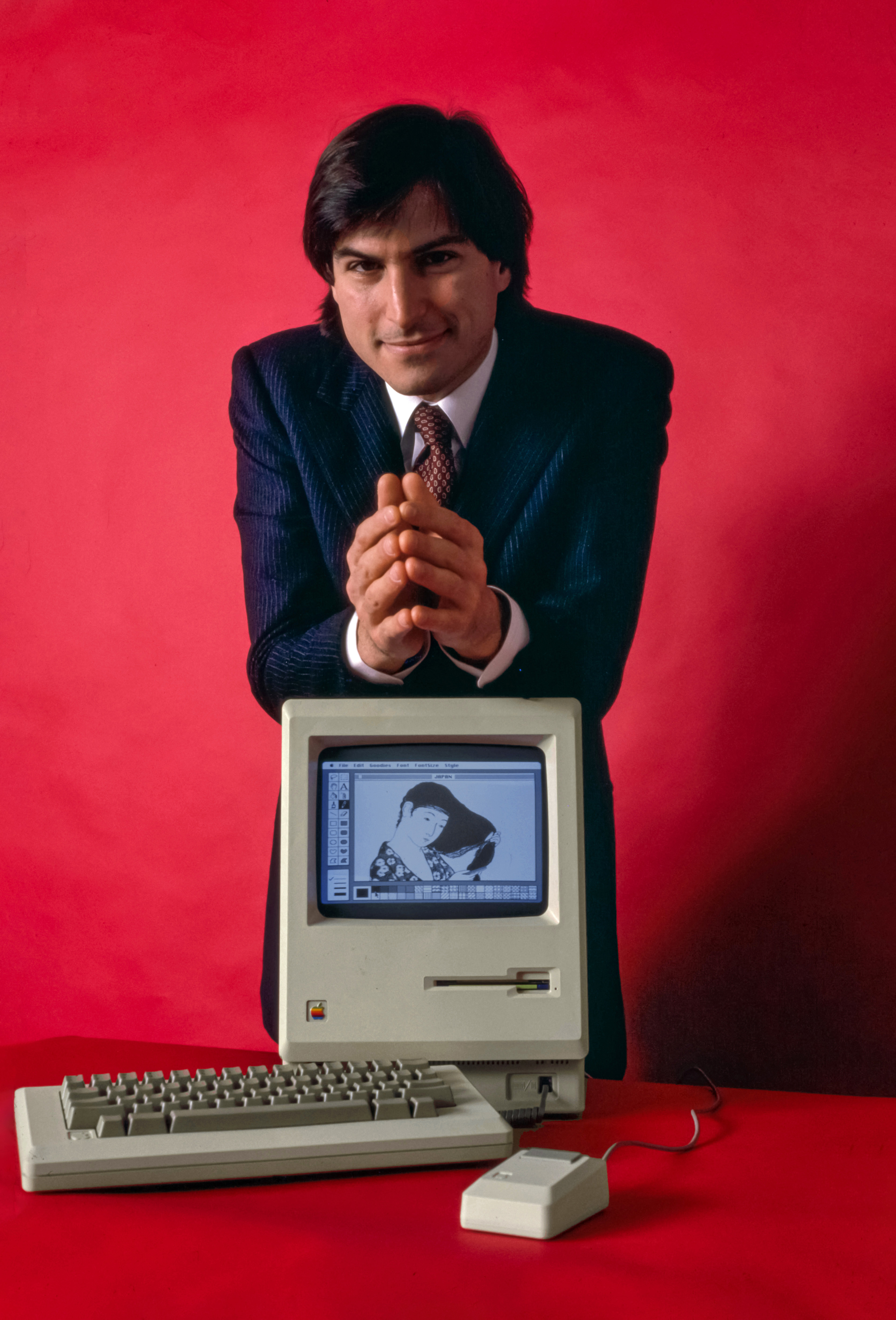
Steve Jobs with the Macintosh, January 1984

In 1982, Regis McKenna was brought in to shape the marketing and launch of the Macintosh. Later the Regis McKenna team grew to include Jane Anderson, Katie Cadigan and Andy Cunningham, who eventually led the Apple account for the agency. Cunningham and Anderson were the primary authors of the Macintosh launch plan. The launch of the Macintosh pioneered many different tactics that are used today in launching technology products, including the "multiple exclusive", event marketing (credited to John Sculley, who brought the concept over from Pepsi), creating a mystique about a product and giving an inside look into a product's creation.

After the Lisa's announcement, John Dvorak discussed rumors of a mysterious "MacIntosh" project at Apple in February 1983. The company announced the Macintosh 128K (manufactured at an Apple factory in Fremont, California) in October 1983, followed by an 18-page brochure included with various magazines in December. The Macintosh was introduced by a US$1.5 million Ridley Scott television commercial, "1984". It aired during the third quarter of Super Bowl XVIII on January 22, 1984, and is now considered a "watershed event" and a "masterpiece". McKenna called the ad "more successful than the Mac itself". "1984" used an unnamed heroine to represent the coming of the Macintosh (indicated by a Picasso-style picture of the computer on her white tank top) as a means of saving humanity from the "conformity" of IBM's attempts to dominate the computer industry. The ad alludes to George Orwell's novel Nineteen Eighty-Four which described a dystopian future ruled by a televised "Big Brother".

Two days after "1984" aired, the Macintosh went on sale, and came bundled with two applications designed to show off its interface: MacWrite and MacPaint. The Macintosh was the first successful mass-market all-in-one desktop personal computer with a graphical user interface, built-in screen, and mouse. It was first demonstrated by Steve Jobs in the first of his famous Mac keynote speeches, and though the Mac garnered an immediate, enthusiastic following, some labelled it a mere "toy". Apple sold it alongside its popular Apple II line until the others were discontinued in the 1990s. Because the operating system was designed largely for the GUI, existing text-mode and command-driven applications had to be redesigned and the programming code rewritten. This was a time-consuming task that many software developers chose not to undertake, and could be regarded as a reason for an initial lack of software for the new system. In April 1984, Microsoft's Multiplan migrated over from MS-DOS, with Microsoft Word following in January 1985. In return for Microsoft's commitment to Macintosh, Apple agreed to not provide software development kits and prototype computers to companies with applications competing with Microsoft's. Apple introduced the Macintosh Office concept the same year with the "Lemmings" ad; infamous for insulting its own potential customers, the ad was not successful.

Apple spent $2.5 million purchasing all 39 advertising pages in a special, post-election issue of Newsweek, and ran a "Test Drive a Macintosh" promotion, in which potential buyers with a credit card could take home a Macintosh for 24 hours and return it to a dealer afterwards. While 200,000 people participated, dealers disliked the promotion, the supply of computers was insufficient for demand, and many were returned in such a bad condition that they could no longer be sold. The computer sold well, nonetheless, reportedly outselling the IBM PCjr which also began shipping early that year; one dealer reported a backlog of more than 600 orders. By April 1984 the company sold 50,000 Macintoshes, and hoped for 70,000 by early May and almost 250,000 by the end of the year.

== Processor and memory ==
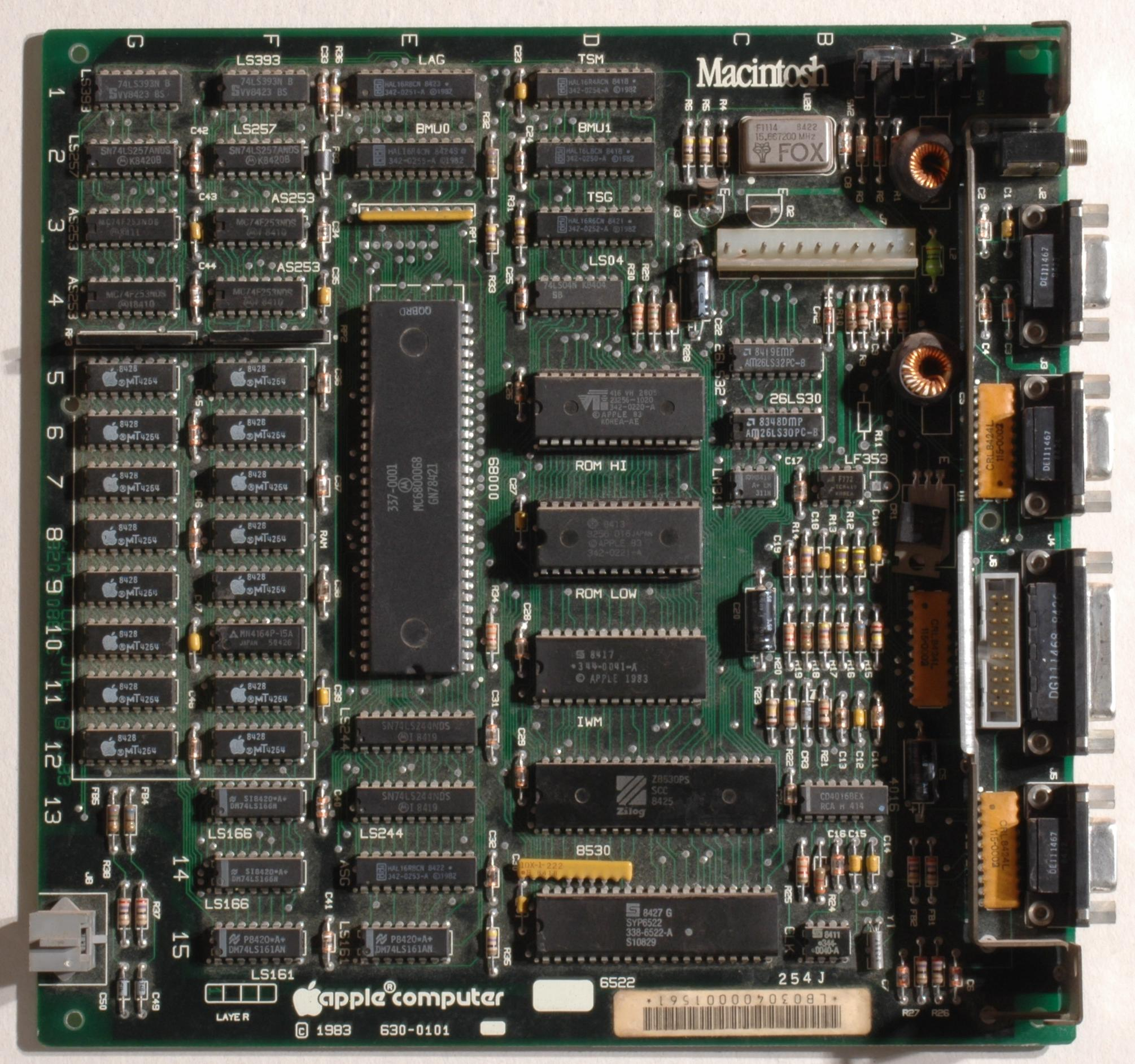
Macintosh motherboard

The heart of the computer is a Motorola 68000 microprocessor running at 7.8336 MHz, connected to 128 KB RAM shared by the processor and the display controller. The boot procedure and some operating system routines are contained in a 64 KB ROM chip. Apple did not offer RAM upgrades. Unlike the Apple II, no source code listings of the Macintosh system ROMs were offered.

The RAM in the Macintosh consists of sixteen 64 kilobit DRAM chips. The 68000 and video controller take turns accessing DRAM every four CPU cycles during display of the frame buffer, while the 68000 has unrestricted access to DRAM during vertical and horizontal blanking intervals. Such an arrangement reduces the overall CPU performance as much as 35% for most code as the display logic often blocks the CPU's access to RAM. Despite the nominally high clock rate, this causes the computer to run slower than several of its competitors and results in an effective clock rate of 6 MHz.

The 128 KB of RAM was seen as a major limitation of the machine. The operating system and other system software occupied about 40 KB, leaving approximately 88 KB for applications and data. For example, when Microsoft's BASIC interpreter was loaded, only about 13 KB remained for programs and data. MacWrite, the bundled word processor, limited documents to approximately 24 KB. Apple expected developers to use routines stored in the Macintosh's relatively large 64 KB ROM to reduce the amount of memory required by their applications.

== Peripherals ==
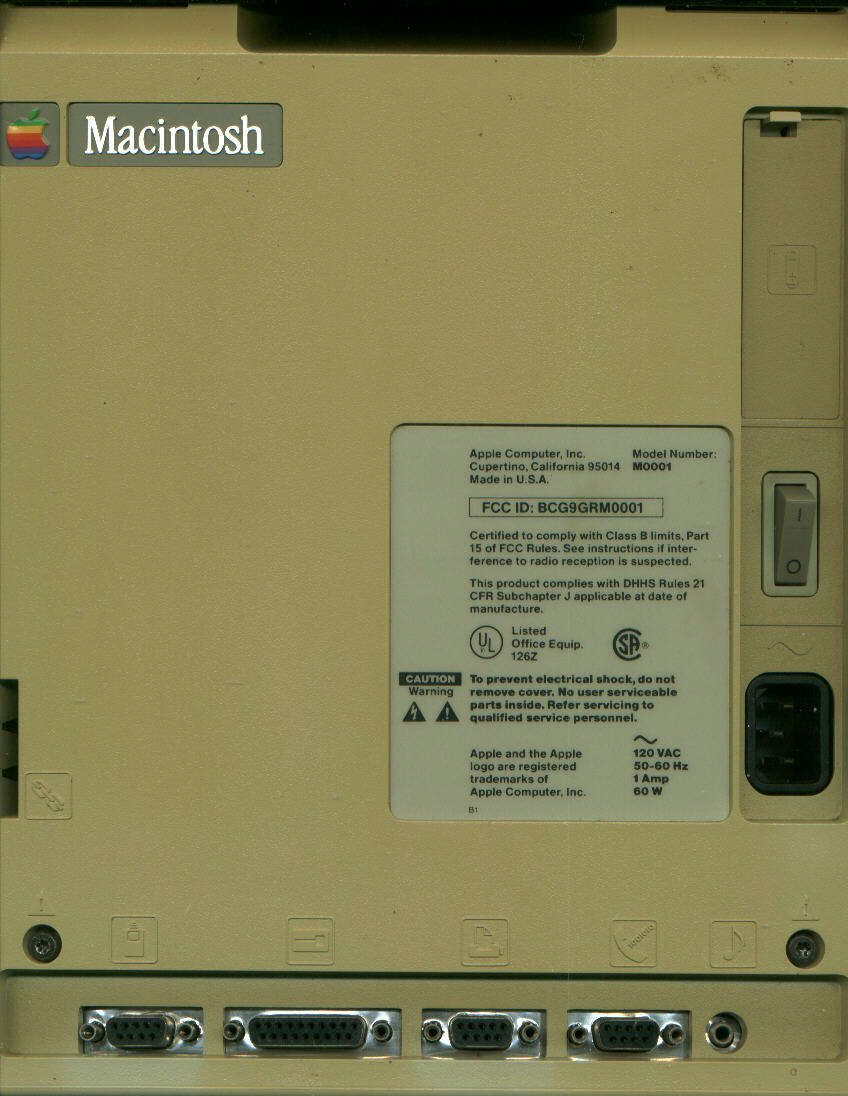
Rear case of an original Macintosh. Along the bottom from left to right are the mouse, floppy, 2× serial (labeled "Printer" and "Modem") and audio connectors

The Macintosh had a built-in monochrome 9-inch (230 mm) CRT display with a fixed resolution of 512 × 342 pixels, at 72 pixels-per-inch.

The rear of the computer had two serial ports using a DE-9 connector and labeled "Printer" and "Modem". They used the RS-422 standard but did not support hardware handshaking. A proprietary 19-pin D-sub connector allowed an external floppy disk drive to be connected. The keyboard connected to a port on the front of the computer using an RJ11 telephone cord-style connector and a proprietary protocol. The mouse used quadrature signals to track movement along the X and Y axes and had a single button.

The included keyboard lacked arrow keys, a numeric keypad and function keys. Apple intended this design to encourage developers to create software for the Macintosh's graphical user interface rather than port applications from older platforms. Apple sold a separate numeric keypad for US$99 (equivalent to $310 in 2025).

Standard headphones could be connected to a monaural audio jack on the computer's rear. Apple also offered a 300 bps modem for US$225 (equivalent to $700 in 2025) and a 1200 bps modem for US$495 (equivalent to $1,530 in 2025).

Initially, the only printer supported by the Macintosh's print software was Apple's ImageWriter, a dot-matrix printer capable of printing graphics at up to 144 dots per inch, twice the resolution of the Macintosh's display. It cost US$595 (equivalent to $1,840 in 2025).

== Storage ==
The Macintosh contained a single internal 400 KB, single-sided 3 1/2-inch floppy disk drive, with no provision for additional internal storage such as a hard drive or a second floppy disk drive. Its capacity exceeded the 360 KB of the 5 1/4-inch drive used in the contemporary IBM PC XT.

The system software was disk-based, conserving RAM. For light use, a single "startup disk" could hold the system software, applications and the data files they created.

Users who needed more applications or larger collections of saved data often required more space than the startup disk could provide. To address this, the startup disk could be temporarily ejected while the computer was running, an unusual capability that remained in classic Mac OS until System 7. However, this arrangement led to frequent disk swapping, which became a nuisance.

The Macintosh External Disk Drive, priced at US$495 (equivalent to $1,530 in 2025), eased the problem by letting users keep a startup disk and a separate data disk loaded simultaneously, reducing the need to swap disks. By late 1984, Apple estimated that 50 to 60 percent of Macintosh owners were purchasing an external drive.

Third-party hard drives were available, but cost considerably more than an external floppy drive. Apple specified that hard drives connect through the serial port, but a few manufacturers opted to use the faster floppy port intended for external drives.

The 128K can only use the Macintosh File System (MFS), a flat file system where folders are just virtual groupings of files. Apple quickly replaced the MFS in 1985 with the Hierarchical File System (HFS), which had a true directory tree, however the 128K did not have enough RAM to load the HFS.

== Cooling ==
The unit did not include a fan, relying instead on convective heat transfer, which made it quiet while in operation. Steve Jobs insisted that the Macintosh ship without a fan, which persisted until the introduction of the Macintosh SE in 1987. Jobs believed that computers equipped with fans tend to distract the user. However, this decision was allegedly a source of many common, costly component failures in the first four Macintosh models.

== Software ==
The Macintosh shipped with the first release of the Macintosh System Software and the Finder, later retroactively named System 1 (formally System 0.97 and Finder 1.0). Apple officially recommended System 2 for the Macintosh 128K, while System 3.2 was the last version to support the computer.

The Macintosh came bundled with MacPaint, which showcased the use of the mouse for drawing, and MacWrite, a word processor that demonstrated WYSIWYG (what you see is what you get) editing. Other available software included MacProject, MacTerminal, and Microsoft Word. Development tools included MacBASIC, MacPascal, and the Macintosh 68000 Development System.

To help users unfamiliar with graphical user interfaces, the Macintosh included a printed manual and an interactive guided tour consisting of a floppy disk and accompanying audio cassette tape that introduced the computer, the mouse, and its bundled software.

== Models ==
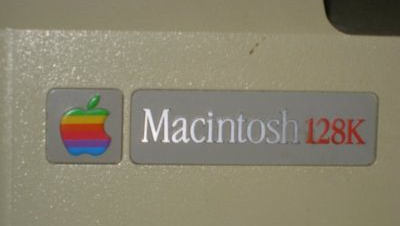
Rear case label of a Macintosh made after November 1984

The computer was introduced in January 1984 simply as the Macintosh. After the introduction of the Macintosh 512K in September 1984, the original model was retroactively renamed the Macintosh 128K to distinguish it from its successor. The machines were internally codenamed "thin Mac" and "Fat Mac", respectively.

Although outwardly identical, the original Macintosh 128K and Macintosh 128K used different logic boards. The redesigned board in the 128K accommodated both 128 KB and 512 KB RAM configurations during manufacturing. This allowed for unsanctioned third-party memory upgrades to 512 KB. Most 128K units also included an updated ROM that supported changes to the 400 KB floppy disk drive. System software suggested Apple was also considering a 256K model.

The additional memory of the 512K greatly expanded the Macintosh's capabilities, allowing applications such as Microsoft Multiplan to run effectively. However, Apple continued selling the 128K for more than a year as its entry-level model, alongside the mid-range 512K and high-end Lisa.

The Macintosh 128K's limited memory restricted the complexity of software that could run on the system, particularly under its graphical, event-driven environment. As a result, its software library remained relatively small, while the Macintosh 512K and the later Macintosh Plus supported a much broader range of applications.

== Expansion ==
Jobs stated that because "customization really is mostly software now ... most of the options in other computers are in Mac", unlike the Apple II the Macintosh 128K did not need slots; he described expansion slots as costly and requiring larger size and more power. It was not officially upgradable by the user and only Apple service centers were permitted to open the case. There were third parties that did offer memory and processor upgrades, allowing the original 128 KB Macintosh to be expanded to a 4 MB 32-bit data path, 68020 CPU (16 MHz), 68881 FPU (16 MHz), 68851 MMU (16 MHz) with an external SCSI port (with a ribbon cable out the clock battery door, internal SCSI hard drive (20 MB Rodime) and a piezo-electric fan for cooling. This upgrade was featured on a Macworld magazine cover titled "Faster than a Vax" in August 1986.

All accessories were external, such as the MacCharlie that added IBM PC compatibility. There was no provision for adding internal storage, more RAM or any upgrade cards; however, some of the Macintosh engineers objected to Jobs's ideas and secretly developed workarounds for them. As an example, the Macintosh was supposed to have only 17 address lines on the motherboard, enough to support 128 KB of system RAM, but the design team added two address lines without Jobs's knowledge, making it possible to expand the computer to 512 KB, although the actual act of upgrading system RAM was difficult and required piggybacking additional RAM chips atop the onboard 4164 chips.

In September 1984, after months of complaints over the Mac's inadequate RAM, Apple released an official 512 KB machine, the Macintosh 512K. At that time, Apple rebranded the original model as "Macintosh 128K" and modified the motherboard to allow easier RAM upgrades. Improving on the hard-wired RAM thus required a motherboard replacement (which was priced similarly to a new computer), or a third-party chip replacement upgrade, which was not only expensive but would void Apple's warranty.

A stock Mac 128K with the original 64K ROM is incompatible with either Apple's external 800 KB drive with the Hierarchical File System or Apple's Hard Disk 20. A Mac 128K that has been upgraded with the newer 128 KB ROM (called a Macintosh 128Ke) can use internal and external 800 KB drives with HFS, as well as the HD20. Both can print on an AppleShare network, but neither can do file sharing because of their limited RAM.

== OEM upgrades ==
By early 1985, much Macintosh software required 512K of memory. Apple sold an official memory upgrade for the Macintosh 128K, which included a motherboard replacement effectively making it a Macintosh 512K, for US$995 (equivalent to $3,000 in 2025), a price that was criticized in the New York Times as being unfair to the early adopters who backed the machine. Additionally, Apple offered an 800 KB floppy disk drive kit, including updated 128K ROMs. Finally, a Mac 128K could be upgraded to a Macintosh Plus by swapping the logic board as well as the case back (to accommodate the different port configuration) and optionally adding the Macintosh Plus extended keyboard. Any of the kits could be purchased alone or together at any time, for a partial or full upgrade for the Macintosh 128K. All upgrades were required to be performed by Apple authorized technicians, who reportedly were instructed by the company to refuse to work on any Macintosh with unofficial upgrades.

== Credits ==
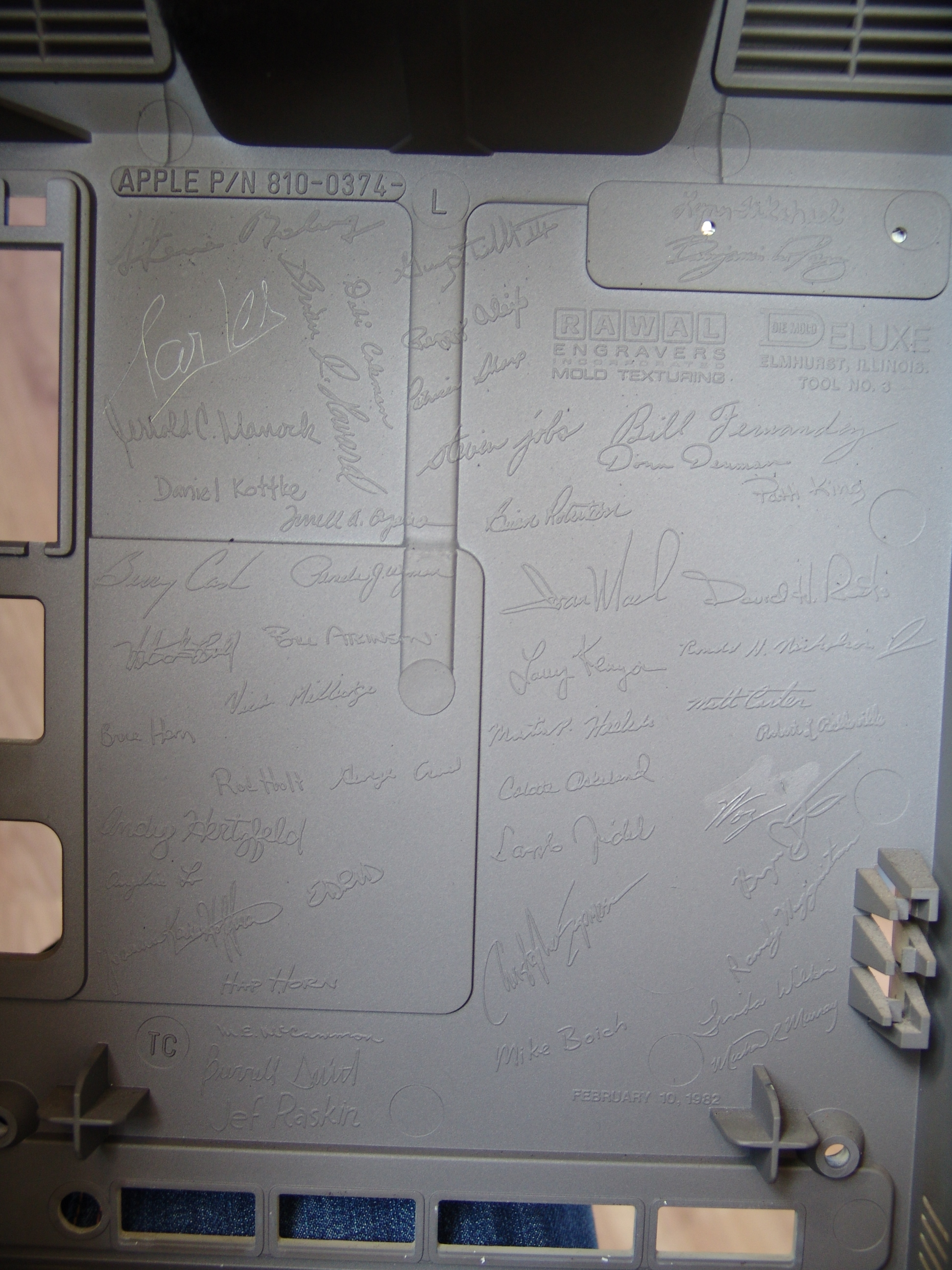
Signatures inside the Macintosh 128K case

The original Macintosh includes the signatures of the Macintosh Division mostly as of early 1982 molded on the inside of the case. The names are Peggy Alexio, Colette Askeland, Bill Atkinson, Steve Balog, Bob Belleville, Mike Boich, Bill Bull, Matt Carter, Berry Cash, Debi Coleman, George Crow, Donn Denman, Christopher Espinosa, Bill Fernandez, Martin Haeberli, Andy Hertzfeld, Joanna Hoffman, Rod Holt, Bruce Horn, Hap Horn, Brian Howard, Steve Jobs, Larry Kenyon, Patti King, Daniel Kottke, Angeline Lo, Ivan Mach, Jerrold Manock, Mary Ellen McCammon, Vicki Milledge, Mike Murray, Ron Nicholson Jr., Terry Oyama, Benjamin Pang, Jef Raskin, Ed Riddle, Brian Robertson, Dave Roots, Patricia Sharp, Burrell Smith, Bryan Stearns, Lynn Takahashi, Guy "Bud" Tribble, Randy Wigginton, Linda Wilkin, Steve Wozniak, Pamela Wyman and Laszlo Zidek.

The Macintosh 128/512K models also included Easter eggs in the OS ROM. If the user went to the system debugger and typed G 4188A4, a graphic would appear in the upper left corner of the screen with "STOLEN FROM APPLE COMPUTER" and a low-resolution facsimile of the Apple logo. This was designed to prevent unauthorized cloning of the Macintosh after numerous Apple II clones appeared, many of which simply stole Apple's copyrighted system ROMs. Steve Jobs allegedly planned that if a Macintosh clone appeared on the market and a court case happened, he could access this Easter egg on the computer to prove that it was using pirated Macintosh ROMs. The Macintosh SE later augmented this Easter Egg with a slideshow of four photos of the Apple design team when G 41D89A was entered.

== Reception ==
Erik Sandberg-Diment of The New York Times in January 1984 stated that Macintosh "presages a revolution in personal computing". Although preferring larger screens and calling the lack of color a "mistake", he praised the "refreshingly crisp and clear" display and lack of fan noise. While unsure whether it would become "a second standard to Big Blue", Ronald Rosenberg of The Boston Globe wrote in February of "a euphoria that Macintosh will change how America computes. Anyone that tries the pint-size machine gets hooked by its features". The computer was indeed so compelling to buyers that one dealer in March described it as "the first $2,500 impulse item".

Gregg Williams of BYTE in February found the hardware and software design (which he predicted would be "imitated but not copied") impressive, but criticized the lack of a standard second disk drive. Williams predicted that the computer would popularize the 3½ in floppy disk drive standard, that the Macintosh would improve Apple's reputation, and that it "will delay IBM's domination of the personal computer market". He concluded that the Macintosh was "the most important development in computers in the last five years. [It] brings us one step closer to the ideal of computer as appliance". In the May 1984 issue Williams added, "Initial reaction to the Macintosh has been strongly, but not overpoweringly, favorable. A few traditional computer users see the mouse, the windows, and the desktop metaphor as silly, useless frills, and others are outraged at the lack of color graphics, but most users are impressed by the machine and its capabilities. Still, some people have expressed concern about the relatively small 128K-byte RAM size, the lack of any computer language sent as part of the basic unit, and the inconvenience of the single disk drive".

Jerry Pournelle, also of BYTE, added that "The Macintosh is a bargain only if you can get it at the heavily discounted price offered to faculty and students of the favored 24 universities in the Macintosh consortium". He noted that the Macintosh attracted people, however, "who previously hated computers... There is, apparently, something about mice and pull-down menus and icons that appeal to people previously intimidated by A> and the like". "People said it's more of a right-brain machine and all that—I think there is some truth to that", Andrew Fluegelman said in 1985. One of the earliest IBM PC owners and founder of Macworld, he said when friends asked what computer to buy, he used to recommend the PC but "now that I have the ability to say, 'Well, you ought to get a Macintosh,' the people who are getting in touch with me are the people I genuinely would say it to. The time had to come when there was a Macintosh before they would ask me that question".

== Timeline ==
Timeline of Compact Macintosh models
See also: List of Mac models and Compact Macintosh

== See also ==
- Pirouette: Turning Points in Design – 2025 exhibition at the Museum of Modern Art
- Technical information on the Mac 128K
