= Mike Boich =

Apple employee

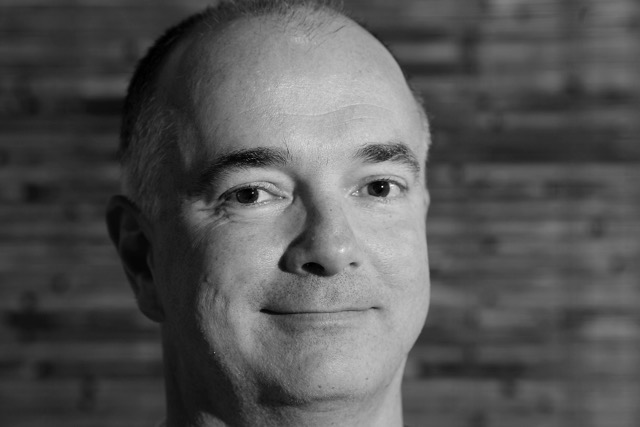
Boich

Mike Boich was an employee at Apple Computer who was in charge of demonstrating the first Macintosh to software developers and potential customers. He is notable as an Apple evangelist who persuaded developers to write computer software. He was instrumental in hiring Apple entrepreneur Guy Kawasaki. His name is listed — as credited — inside the original Macintosh 128k.
